

445001–445100 

|-bgcolor=#d6d6d6
| 445001 ||  || — || April 12, 2008 || Kitt Peak || Spacewatch || THM || align=right | 2.8 km || 
|-id=002 bgcolor=#d6d6d6
| 445002 ||  || — || April 6, 2008 || Socorro || LINEAR || — || align=right | 2.4 km || 
|-id=003 bgcolor=#d6d6d6
| 445003 ||  || — || February 29, 2008 || Kitt Peak || Spacewatch || — || align=right | 2.9 km || 
|-id=004 bgcolor=#d6d6d6
| 445004 ||  || — || March 15, 2008 || Kitt Peak || Spacewatch || — || align=right | 2.2 km || 
|-id=005 bgcolor=#d6d6d6
| 445005 ||  || — || April 4, 2008 || Catalina || CSS || — || align=right | 3.6 km || 
|-id=006 bgcolor=#d6d6d6
| 445006 ||  || — || April 6, 2008 || Kitt Peak || Spacewatch || — || align=right | 3.4 km || 
|-id=007 bgcolor=#d6d6d6
| 445007 ||  || — || November 5, 2005 || Kitt Peak || Spacewatch || — || align=right | 2.6 km || 
|-id=008 bgcolor=#d6d6d6
| 445008 ||  || — || April 25, 2008 || Dauban || F. Kugel || — || align=right | 3.7 km || 
|-id=009 bgcolor=#d6d6d6
| 445009 ||  || — || April 3, 2008 || Kitt Peak || Spacewatch || — || align=right | 2.5 km || 
|-id=010 bgcolor=#d6d6d6
| 445010 ||  || — || March 30, 2008 || Kitt Peak || Spacewatch || — || align=right | 2.8 km || 
|-id=011 bgcolor=#d6d6d6
| 445011 ||  || — || April 26, 2008 || Mount Lemmon || Mount Lemmon Survey || EOS || align=right | 3.5 km || 
|-id=012 bgcolor=#d6d6d6
| 445012 ||  || — || March 15, 2007 || Mount Lemmon || Mount Lemmon Survey || — || align=right | 2.4 km || 
|-id=013 bgcolor=#d6d6d6
| 445013 ||  || — || April 5, 2008 || Kitt Peak || Spacewatch || EOS || align=right | 1.9 km || 
|-id=014 bgcolor=#d6d6d6
| 445014 ||  || — || April 26, 2008 || Mount Lemmon || Mount Lemmon Survey || — || align=right | 2.3 km || 
|-id=015 bgcolor=#d6d6d6
| 445015 ||  || — || April 29, 2008 || Kitt Peak || Spacewatch || — || align=right | 2.9 km || 
|-id=016 bgcolor=#d6d6d6
| 445016 ||  || — || April 15, 2008 || Mount Lemmon || Mount Lemmon Survey || — || align=right | 2.7 km || 
|-id=017 bgcolor=#d6d6d6
| 445017 ||  || — || April 29, 2008 || Kitt Peak || Spacewatch || — || align=right | 4.3 km || 
|-id=018 bgcolor=#d6d6d6
| 445018 ||  || — || January 5, 2000 || Kitt Peak || Spacewatch || — || align=right | 5.1 km || 
|-id=019 bgcolor=#fefefe
| 445019 ||  || — || March 30, 2008 || Kitt Peak || Spacewatch || — || align=right data-sort-value="0.61" | 610 m || 
|-id=020 bgcolor=#d6d6d6
| 445020 ||  || — || May 29, 2008 || Kitt Peak || Spacewatch || — || align=right | 3.4 km || 
|-id=021 bgcolor=#d6d6d6
| 445021 ||  || — || April 30, 2008 || Kitt Peak || Spacewatch || — || align=right | 2.9 km || 
|-id=022 bgcolor=#d6d6d6
| 445022 ||  || — || May 30, 2008 || Kitt Peak || Spacewatch || — || align=right | 3.8 km || 
|-id=023 bgcolor=#d6d6d6
| 445023 ||  || — || April 24, 2008 || Kitt Peak || Spacewatch || — || align=right | 3.7 km || 
|-id=024 bgcolor=#FA8072
| 445024 ||  || — || July 1, 2008 || Kitt Peak || Spacewatch || — || align=right data-sort-value="0.75" | 750 m || 
|-id=025 bgcolor=#FFC2E0
| 445025 ||  || — || July 5, 2008 || Siding Spring || SSS || APO +1kmcritical || align=right | 2.1 km || 
|-id=026 bgcolor=#fefefe
| 445026 ||  || — || July 25, 2008 || Siding Spring || SSS || — || align=right data-sort-value="0.95" | 950 m || 
|-id=027 bgcolor=#fefefe
| 445027 ||  || — || July 30, 2008 || Mount Lemmon || Mount Lemmon Survey || — || align=right data-sort-value="0.78" | 780 m || 
|-id=028 bgcolor=#fefefe
| 445028 ||  || — || August 7, 2008 || Kitt Peak || Spacewatch || — || align=right data-sort-value="0.54" | 540 m || 
|-id=029 bgcolor=#fefefe
| 445029 ||  || — || August 21, 2008 || Kitt Peak || Spacewatch || — || align=right data-sort-value="0.73" | 730 m || 
|-id=030 bgcolor=#fefefe
| 445030 ||  || — || August 21, 2008 || Kitt Peak || Spacewatch || — || align=right data-sort-value="0.86" | 860 m || 
|-id=031 bgcolor=#fefefe
| 445031 ||  || — || August 24, 2008 || Kitt Peak || Spacewatch || — || align=right data-sort-value="0.73" | 730 m || 
|-id=032 bgcolor=#fefefe
| 445032 ||  || — || August 24, 2008 || Kitt Peak || Spacewatch || — || align=right data-sort-value="0.70" | 700 m || 
|-id=033 bgcolor=#fefefe
| 445033 ||  || — || September 5, 2008 || Socorro || LINEAR || V || align=right data-sort-value="0.74" | 740 m || 
|-id=034 bgcolor=#fefefe
| 445034 ||  || — || September 2, 2008 || Kitt Peak || Spacewatch || — || align=right data-sort-value="0.61" | 610 m || 
|-id=035 bgcolor=#fefefe
| 445035 ||  || — || September 2, 2008 || Kitt Peak || Spacewatch || — || align=right data-sort-value="0.69" | 690 m || 
|-id=036 bgcolor=#fefefe
| 445036 ||  || — || September 5, 2008 || Kitt Peak || Spacewatch || — || align=right data-sort-value="0.82" | 820 m || 
|-id=037 bgcolor=#fefefe
| 445037 ||  || — || September 5, 2008 || Kitt Peak || Spacewatch || — || align=right data-sort-value="0.82" | 820 m || 
|-id=038 bgcolor=#fefefe
| 445038 ||  || — || September 7, 2008 || Mount Lemmon || Mount Lemmon Survey || — || align=right data-sort-value="0.80" | 800 m || 
|-id=039 bgcolor=#fefefe
| 445039 ||  || — || September 7, 2008 || Mount Lemmon || Mount Lemmon Survey || — || align=right data-sort-value="0.67" | 670 m || 
|-id=040 bgcolor=#fefefe
| 445040 ||  || — || September 2, 2008 || Kitt Peak || Spacewatch || — || align=right data-sort-value="0.62" | 620 m || 
|-id=041 bgcolor=#fefefe
| 445041 ||  || — || March 11, 2000 || Socorro || LINEAR || — || align=right | 1.0 km || 
|-id=042 bgcolor=#fefefe
| 445042 ||  || — || September 7, 2008 || Catalina || CSS || — || align=right data-sort-value="0.62" | 620 m || 
|-id=043 bgcolor=#fefefe
| 445043 ||  || — || September 4, 2008 || Socorro || LINEAR || — || align=right data-sort-value="0.86" | 860 m || 
|-id=044 bgcolor=#fefefe
| 445044 ||  || — || September 4, 2008 || Kitt Peak || Spacewatch || V || align=right data-sort-value="0.67" | 670 m || 
|-id=045 bgcolor=#fefefe
| 445045 ||  || — || September 19, 2008 || Kitt Peak || Spacewatch || MAS || align=right data-sort-value="0.65" | 650 m || 
|-id=046 bgcolor=#fefefe
| 445046 ||  || — || September 19, 2008 || Kitt Peak || Spacewatch || — || align=right data-sort-value="0.78" | 780 m || 
|-id=047 bgcolor=#fefefe
| 445047 ||  || — || September 20, 2008 || Kitt Peak || Spacewatch || V || align=right data-sort-value="0.59" | 590 m || 
|-id=048 bgcolor=#fefefe
| 445048 ||  || — || September 7, 2008 || Mount Lemmon || Mount Lemmon Survey || — || align=right data-sort-value="0.71" | 710 m || 
|-id=049 bgcolor=#fefefe
| 445049 ||  || — || September 20, 2008 || Mount Lemmon || Mount Lemmon Survey || MAS || align=right data-sort-value="0.71" | 710 m || 
|-id=050 bgcolor=#fefefe
| 445050 ||  || — || September 20, 2008 || Kitt Peak || Spacewatch || MAS || align=right data-sort-value="0.68" | 680 m || 
|-id=051 bgcolor=#fefefe
| 445051 ||  || — || September 21, 2008 || Kitt Peak || Spacewatch || NYS || align=right data-sort-value="0.58" | 580 m || 
|-id=052 bgcolor=#fefefe
| 445052 ||  || — || September 22, 2008 || Kitt Peak || Spacewatch || — || align=right data-sort-value="0.68" | 680 m || 
|-id=053 bgcolor=#fefefe
| 445053 ||  || — || September 9, 2008 || Mount Lemmon || Mount Lemmon Survey || — || align=right data-sort-value="0.71" | 710 m || 
|-id=054 bgcolor=#fefefe
| 445054 ||  || — || September 21, 2008 || Kitt Peak || Spacewatch || — || align=right data-sort-value="0.62" | 620 m || 
|-id=055 bgcolor=#fefefe
| 445055 ||  || — || September 22, 2008 || Mount Lemmon || Mount Lemmon Survey || — || align=right data-sort-value="0.90" | 900 m || 
|-id=056 bgcolor=#fefefe
| 445056 ||  || — || September 22, 2008 || Kitt Peak || Spacewatch || NYS || align=right data-sort-value="0.62" | 620 m || 
|-id=057 bgcolor=#fefefe
| 445057 ||  || — || September 6, 2008 || Catalina || CSS || — || align=right data-sort-value="0.73" | 730 m || 
|-id=058 bgcolor=#fefefe
| 445058 ||  || — || September 25, 2008 || Kitt Peak || Spacewatch || MAS || align=right data-sort-value="0.62" | 620 m || 
|-id=059 bgcolor=#fefefe
| 445059 ||  || — || August 20, 2004 || Kitt Peak || Spacewatch || — || align=right data-sort-value="0.86" | 860 m || 
|-id=060 bgcolor=#fefefe
| 445060 ||  || — || September 22, 2008 || Kitt Peak || Spacewatch || — || align=right data-sort-value="0.82" | 820 m || 
|-id=061 bgcolor=#fefefe
| 445061 ||  || — || September 26, 2008 || Kitt Peak || Spacewatch || — || align=right data-sort-value="0.68" | 680 m || 
|-id=062 bgcolor=#fefefe
| 445062 ||  || — || September 7, 2008 || Mount Lemmon || Mount Lemmon Survey || — || align=right data-sort-value="0.69" | 690 m || 
|-id=063 bgcolor=#fefefe
| 445063 ||  || — || September 26, 2008 || Kitt Peak || Spacewatch || — || align=right data-sort-value="0.85" | 850 m || 
|-id=064 bgcolor=#fefefe
| 445064 ||  || — || September 26, 2008 || Kitt Peak || Spacewatch || — || align=right data-sort-value="0.80" | 800 m || 
|-id=065 bgcolor=#d6d6d6
| 445065 ||  || — || April 7, 2005 || Mount Lemmon || Mount Lemmon Survey || 3:2 || align=right | 5.5 km || 
|-id=066 bgcolor=#fefefe
| 445066 ||  || — || September 29, 2008 || Catalina || CSS || NYS || align=right data-sort-value="0.50" | 500 m || 
|-id=067 bgcolor=#fefefe
| 445067 ||  || — || September 22, 2008 || Mount Lemmon || Mount Lemmon Survey || — || align=right data-sort-value="0.87" | 870 m || 
|-id=068 bgcolor=#d6d6d6
| 445068 ||  || — || September 24, 2008 || Kitt Peak || Spacewatch || SHU3:2 || align=right | 4.7 km || 
|-id=069 bgcolor=#fefefe
| 445069 ||  || — || September 28, 2008 || Mount Lemmon || Mount Lemmon Survey || — || align=right data-sort-value="0.71" | 710 m || 
|-id=070 bgcolor=#fefefe
| 445070 ||  || — || September 23, 2008 || Kitt Peak || Spacewatch || NYS || align=right data-sort-value="0.63" | 630 m || 
|-id=071 bgcolor=#fefefe
| 445071 ||  || — || September 20, 2008 || Catalina || CSS || — || align=right data-sort-value="0.82" | 820 m || 
|-id=072 bgcolor=#fefefe
| 445072 ||  || — || September 22, 2008 || Kitt Peak || Spacewatch || MAS || align=right data-sort-value="0.75" | 750 m || 
|-id=073 bgcolor=#fefefe
| 445073 ||  || — || September 22, 2008 || Kitt Peak || Spacewatch || — || align=right data-sort-value="0.69" | 690 m || 
|-id=074 bgcolor=#fefefe
| 445074 ||  || — || October 1, 2008 || Mount Lemmon || Mount Lemmon Survey || NYS || align=right data-sort-value="0.66" | 660 m || 
|-id=075 bgcolor=#fefefe
| 445075 ||  || — || October 1, 2008 || Mount Lemmon || Mount Lemmon Survey || — || align=right data-sort-value="0.71" | 710 m || 
|-id=076 bgcolor=#fefefe
| 445076 ||  || — || October 1, 2008 || Mount Lemmon || Mount Lemmon Survey || — || align=right data-sort-value="0.78" | 780 m || 
|-id=077 bgcolor=#fefefe
| 445077 ||  || — || October 1, 2008 || La Sagra || OAM Obs. || NYS || align=right data-sort-value="0.50" | 500 m || 
|-id=078 bgcolor=#fefefe
| 445078 ||  || — || October 1, 2008 || Kitt Peak || Spacewatch || NYS || align=right data-sort-value="0.60" | 600 m || 
|-id=079 bgcolor=#fefefe
| 445079 ||  || — || October 1, 2008 || Mount Lemmon || Mount Lemmon Survey || — || align=right data-sort-value="0.90" | 900 m || 
|-id=080 bgcolor=#fefefe
| 445080 ||  || — || October 1, 2008 || Mount Lemmon || Mount Lemmon Survey || — || align=right data-sort-value="0.75" | 750 m || 
|-id=081 bgcolor=#fefefe
| 445081 ||  || — || October 2, 2008 || Kitt Peak || Spacewatch || V || align=right data-sort-value="0.72" | 720 m || 
|-id=082 bgcolor=#fefefe
| 445082 ||  || — || October 2, 2008 || Kitt Peak || Spacewatch || V || align=right data-sort-value="0.53" | 530 m || 
|-id=083 bgcolor=#fefefe
| 445083 ||  || — || September 21, 2008 || Kitt Peak || Spacewatch || NYS || align=right data-sort-value="0.58" | 580 m || 
|-id=084 bgcolor=#fefefe
| 445084 ||  || — || September 25, 2008 || Kitt Peak || Spacewatch || — || align=right data-sort-value="0.86" | 860 m || 
|-id=085 bgcolor=#fefefe
| 445085 ||  || — || September 4, 2008 || Kitt Peak || Spacewatch || — || align=right data-sort-value="0.88" | 880 m || 
|-id=086 bgcolor=#fefefe
| 445086 ||  || — || October 6, 2008 || Mount Lemmon || Mount Lemmon Survey || — || align=right data-sort-value="0.75" | 750 m || 
|-id=087 bgcolor=#fefefe
| 445087 ||  || — || September 23, 2008 || Catalina || CSS || — || align=right data-sort-value="0.73" | 730 m || 
|-id=088 bgcolor=#fefefe
| 445088 ||  || — || September 23, 2008 || Catalina || CSS || — || align=right data-sort-value="0.78" | 780 m || 
|-id=089 bgcolor=#fefefe
| 445089 ||  || — || September 21, 2008 || Kitt Peak || Spacewatch || — || align=right data-sort-value="0.86" | 860 m || 
|-id=090 bgcolor=#fefefe
| 445090 ||  || — || October 9, 2008 || Mount Lemmon || Mount Lemmon Survey || MAS || align=right data-sort-value="0.59" | 590 m || 
|-id=091 bgcolor=#fefefe
| 445091 ||  || — || October 6, 2008 || Mount Lemmon || Mount Lemmon Survey || — || align=right data-sort-value="0.71" | 710 m || 
|-id=092 bgcolor=#fefefe
| 445092 ||  || — || October 8, 2008 || Kitt Peak || Spacewatch || — || align=right data-sort-value="0.65" | 650 m || 
|-id=093 bgcolor=#fefefe
| 445093 ||  || — || October 7, 2008 || Mount Lemmon || Mount Lemmon Survey || — || align=right data-sort-value="0.75" | 750 m || 
|-id=094 bgcolor=#fefefe
| 445094 ||  || — || October 6, 2008 || Kitt Peak || Spacewatch || — || align=right data-sort-value="0.85" | 850 m || 
|-id=095 bgcolor=#fefefe
| 445095 ||  || — || October 8, 2008 || Mount Lemmon || Mount Lemmon Survey || — || align=right data-sort-value="0.75" | 750 m || 
|-id=096 bgcolor=#fefefe
| 445096 ||  || — || December 25, 2005 || Mount Lemmon || Mount Lemmon Survey || — || align=right data-sort-value="0.77" | 770 m || 
|-id=097 bgcolor=#fefefe
| 445097 ||  || — || October 1, 2008 || Kitt Peak || Spacewatch || — || align=right data-sort-value="0.65" | 650 m || 
|-id=098 bgcolor=#fefefe
| 445098 ||  || — || October 20, 2008 || Kitt Peak || Spacewatch || MAS || align=right data-sort-value="0.68" | 680 m || 
|-id=099 bgcolor=#fefefe
| 445099 ||  || — || September 24, 2008 || Mount Lemmon || Mount Lemmon Survey || — || align=right data-sort-value="0.71" | 710 m || 
|-id=100 bgcolor=#fefefe
| 445100 ||  || — || October 20, 2008 || Mount Lemmon || Mount Lemmon Survey || MAS || align=right data-sort-value="0.70" | 700 m || 
|}

445101–445200 

|-bgcolor=#fefefe
| 445101 ||  || — || October 20, 2008 || Mount Lemmon || Mount Lemmon Survey || — || align=right data-sort-value="0.61" | 610 m || 
|-id=102 bgcolor=#fefefe
| 445102 ||  || — || October 20, 2008 || Kitt Peak || Spacewatch || V || align=right data-sort-value="0.65" | 650 m || 
|-id=103 bgcolor=#fefefe
| 445103 ||  || — || October 21, 2008 || Kitt Peak || Spacewatch || NYS || align=right data-sort-value="0.52" | 520 m || 
|-id=104 bgcolor=#fefefe
| 445104 ||  || — || October 21, 2008 || Kitt Peak || Spacewatch || — || align=right data-sort-value="0.68" | 680 m || 
|-id=105 bgcolor=#fefefe
| 445105 ||  || — || October 21, 2008 || Kitt Peak || Spacewatch || ERI || align=right | 1.3 km || 
|-id=106 bgcolor=#fefefe
| 445106 ||  || — || October 21, 2008 || Kitt Peak || Spacewatch || — || align=right | 1.0 km || 
|-id=107 bgcolor=#fefefe
| 445107 ||  || — || October 22, 2008 || Kitt Peak || Spacewatch || — || align=right data-sort-value="0.62" | 620 m || 
|-id=108 bgcolor=#fefefe
| 445108 ||  || — || October 21, 2008 || Kitt Peak || Spacewatch || — || align=right data-sort-value="0.86" | 860 m || 
|-id=109 bgcolor=#fefefe
| 445109 ||  || — || October 22, 2008 || Kitt Peak || Spacewatch || — || align=right data-sort-value="0.83" | 830 m || 
|-id=110 bgcolor=#fefefe
| 445110 ||  || — || October 9, 2008 || Kitt Peak || Spacewatch || — || align=right data-sort-value="0.72" | 720 m || 
|-id=111 bgcolor=#fefefe
| 445111 ||  || — || September 6, 2008 || Mount Lemmon || Mount Lemmon Survey || — || align=right data-sort-value="0.62" | 620 m || 
|-id=112 bgcolor=#fefefe
| 445112 ||  || — || October 23, 2008 || Kitt Peak || Spacewatch || — || align=right data-sort-value="0.86" | 860 m || 
|-id=113 bgcolor=#fefefe
| 445113 ||  || — || October 23, 2008 || Mount Lemmon || Mount Lemmon Survey || — || align=right data-sort-value="0.68" | 680 m || 
|-id=114 bgcolor=#fefefe
| 445114 ||  || — || October 23, 2008 || Kitt Peak || Spacewatch || — || align=right data-sort-value="0.86" | 860 m || 
|-id=115 bgcolor=#fefefe
| 445115 ||  || — || October 23, 2008 || Kitt Peak || Spacewatch || MAS || align=right data-sort-value="0.68" | 680 m || 
|-id=116 bgcolor=#fefefe
| 445116 ||  || — || October 24, 2008 || Kitt Peak || Spacewatch || NYS || align=right data-sort-value="0.60" | 600 m || 
|-id=117 bgcolor=#fefefe
| 445117 ||  || — || October 24, 2008 || Mount Lemmon || Mount Lemmon Survey || — || align=right data-sort-value="0.96" | 960 m || 
|-id=118 bgcolor=#fefefe
| 445118 ||  || — || October 27, 2008 || Mount Lemmon || Mount Lemmon Survey || — || align=right data-sort-value="0.64" | 640 m || 
|-id=119 bgcolor=#d6d6d6
| 445119 ||  || — || October 23, 2008 || Kitt Peak || Spacewatch || SHU3:2 || align=right | 5.3 km || 
|-id=120 bgcolor=#fefefe
| 445120 ||  || — || October 25, 2008 || Kitt Peak || Spacewatch || — || align=right data-sort-value="0.75" | 750 m || 
|-id=121 bgcolor=#fefefe
| 445121 ||  || — || October 27, 2008 || Kitt Peak || Spacewatch || MAS || align=right data-sort-value="0.62" | 620 m || 
|-id=122 bgcolor=#fefefe
| 445122 ||  || — || October 27, 2008 || Kitt Peak || Spacewatch || NYS || align=right data-sort-value="0.55" | 550 m || 
|-id=123 bgcolor=#fefefe
| 445123 ||  || — || October 27, 2008 || Kitt Peak || Spacewatch || MAS || align=right data-sort-value="0.68" | 680 m || 
|-id=124 bgcolor=#fefefe
| 445124 ||  || — || September 21, 2008 || Mount Lemmon || Mount Lemmon Survey || NYS || align=right data-sort-value="0.60" | 600 m || 
|-id=125 bgcolor=#d6d6d6
| 445125 ||  || — || October 28, 2008 || Mount Lemmon || Mount Lemmon Survey || 3:2 || align=right | 8.5 km || 
|-id=126 bgcolor=#fefefe
| 445126 ||  || — || October 12, 2004 || Kitt Peak || Spacewatch || CLA || align=right | 1.8 km || 
|-id=127 bgcolor=#fefefe
| 445127 ||  || — || October 31, 2008 || Kitt Peak || Spacewatch || — || align=right data-sort-value="0.90" | 900 m || 
|-id=128 bgcolor=#fefefe
| 445128 ||  || — || October 23, 2008 || Kitt Peak || Spacewatch || — || align=right data-sort-value="0.71" | 710 m || 
|-id=129 bgcolor=#fefefe
| 445129 ||  || — || November 1, 2008 || Mount Lemmon || Mount Lemmon Survey || — || align=right data-sort-value="0.65" | 650 m || 
|-id=130 bgcolor=#fefefe
| 445130 ||  || — || November 2, 2008 || Kitt Peak || Spacewatch || — || align=right data-sort-value="0.94" | 940 m || 
|-id=131 bgcolor=#fefefe
| 445131 ||  || — || June 8, 2007 || Kitt Peak || Spacewatch || V || align=right data-sort-value="0.60" | 600 m || 
|-id=132 bgcolor=#FA8072
| 445132 ||  || — || September 20, 2008 || Mount Lemmon || Mount Lemmon Survey || — || align=right data-sort-value="0.93" | 930 m || 
|-id=133 bgcolor=#fefefe
| 445133 ||  || — || November 17, 2008 || Kitt Peak || Spacewatch || V || align=right data-sort-value="0.74" | 740 m || 
|-id=134 bgcolor=#fefefe
| 445134 ||  || — || November 17, 2008 || Kitt Peak || Spacewatch || — || align=right | 2.1 km || 
|-id=135 bgcolor=#fefefe
| 445135 ||  || — || November 17, 2008 || Kitt Peak || Spacewatch || MAS || align=right data-sort-value="0.59" | 590 m || 
|-id=136 bgcolor=#fefefe
| 445136 ||  || — || November 17, 2008 || Kitt Peak || Spacewatch || NYS || align=right data-sort-value="0.66" | 660 m || 
|-id=137 bgcolor=#fefefe
| 445137 ||  || — || November 18, 2008 || Catalina || CSS || — || align=right data-sort-value="0.77" | 770 m || 
|-id=138 bgcolor=#fefefe
| 445138 ||  || — || November 18, 2008 || Catalina || CSS || MAS || align=right data-sort-value="0.65" | 650 m || 
|-id=139 bgcolor=#fefefe
| 445139 ||  || — || September 8, 2004 || Socorro || LINEAR || MAS || align=right data-sort-value="0.71" | 710 m || 
|-id=140 bgcolor=#fefefe
| 445140 ||  || — || November 17, 2008 || Kitt Peak || Spacewatch || — || align=right | 1.0 km || 
|-id=141 bgcolor=#fefefe
| 445141 ||  || — || November 20, 2008 || Kitt Peak || Spacewatch || — || align=right data-sort-value="0.62" | 620 m || 
|-id=142 bgcolor=#fefefe
| 445142 ||  || — || November 22, 2008 || Mount Lemmon || Mount Lemmon Survey || — || align=right data-sort-value="0.82" | 820 m || 
|-id=143 bgcolor=#fefefe
| 445143 ||  || — || November 26, 2008 || Vicques || M. Ory || — || align=right data-sort-value="0.75" | 750 m || 
|-id=144 bgcolor=#fefefe
| 445144 ||  || — || October 30, 2008 || Catalina || CSS || — || align=right data-sort-value="0.90" | 900 m || 
|-id=145 bgcolor=#fefefe
| 445145 ||  || — || November 30, 2008 || Kitt Peak || Spacewatch || — || align=right data-sort-value="0.75" | 750 m || 
|-id=146 bgcolor=#fefefe
| 445146 ||  || — || November 19, 2008 || Mount Lemmon || Mount Lemmon Survey || — || align=right data-sort-value="0.65" | 650 m || 
|-id=147 bgcolor=#fefefe
| 445147 ||  || — || October 10, 2004 || Kitt Peak || Spacewatch || MAS || align=right data-sort-value="0.65" | 650 m || 
|-id=148 bgcolor=#fefefe
| 445148 ||  || — || November 19, 2008 || Mount Lemmon || Mount Lemmon Survey || — || align=right data-sort-value="0.71" | 710 m || 
|-id=149 bgcolor=#fefefe
| 445149 ||  || — || November 19, 2008 || Kitt Peak || Spacewatch || — || align=right data-sort-value="0.75" | 750 m || 
|-id=150 bgcolor=#fefefe
| 445150 ||  || — || November 30, 2008 || Socorro || LINEAR || — || align=right | 1.2 km || 
|-id=151 bgcolor=#fefefe
| 445151 ||  || — || December 1, 2008 || Dauban || F. Kugel || — || align=right data-sort-value="0.71" | 710 m || 
|-id=152 bgcolor=#fefefe
| 445152 ||  || — || December 4, 2008 || Mount Lemmon || Mount Lemmon Survey || — || align=right | 1.00 km || 
|-id=153 bgcolor=#fefefe
| 445153 ||  || — || December 5, 2008 || Kitt Peak || Spacewatch || NYS || align=right data-sort-value="0.76" | 760 m || 
|-id=154 bgcolor=#fefefe
| 445154 || 2008 YW || — || December 17, 2008 || Nazaret || G. Muler, J. M. Ruiz || NYS || align=right data-sort-value="0.58" | 580 m || 
|-id=155 bgcolor=#fefefe
| 445155 ||  || — || December 21, 2008 || La Sagra || OAM Obs. || — || align=right data-sort-value="0.90" | 900 m || 
|-id=156 bgcolor=#fefefe
| 445156 ||  || — || December 26, 2008 || Weihai || Shandong University Obs. || MAS || align=right data-sort-value="0.86" | 860 m || 
|-id=157 bgcolor=#E9E9E9
| 445157 ||  || — || January 7, 2005 || Kitt Peak || Spacewatch || — || align=right | 1.4 km || 
|-id=158 bgcolor=#fefefe
| 445158 ||  || — || December 29, 2008 || Mount Lemmon || Mount Lemmon Survey || — || align=right data-sort-value="0.95" | 950 m || 
|-id=159 bgcolor=#fefefe
| 445159 ||  || — || December 30, 2008 || Kitt Peak || Spacewatch || NYS || align=right data-sort-value="0.72" | 720 m || 
|-id=160 bgcolor=#fefefe
| 445160 ||  || — || November 19, 2008 || Mount Lemmon || Mount Lemmon Survey || — || align=right | 1.0 km || 
|-id=161 bgcolor=#E9E9E9
| 445161 ||  || — || August 10, 2007 || Kitt Peak || Spacewatch || — || align=right data-sort-value="0.86" | 860 m || 
|-id=162 bgcolor=#fefefe
| 445162 ||  || — || December 22, 2008 || Kitt Peak || Spacewatch || — || align=right data-sort-value="0.83" | 830 m || 
|-id=163 bgcolor=#E9E9E9
| 445163 ||  || — || December 22, 2008 || Mount Lemmon || Mount Lemmon Survey || — || align=right | 1.5 km || 
|-id=164 bgcolor=#E9E9E9
| 445164 ||  || — || December 22, 2008 || Kitt Peak || Spacewatch || — || align=right | 2.0 km || 
|-id=165 bgcolor=#E9E9E9
| 445165 ||  || — || December 22, 2008 || Kitt Peak || Spacewatch || — || align=right | 1.2 km || 
|-id=166 bgcolor=#fefefe
| 445166 ||  || — || December 21, 2008 || Mount Lemmon || Mount Lemmon Survey || MAS || align=right data-sort-value="0.68" | 680 m || 
|-id=167 bgcolor=#fefefe
| 445167 ||  || — || December 31, 2008 || Socorro || LINEAR || — || align=right data-sort-value="0.88" | 880 m || 
|-id=168 bgcolor=#fefefe
| 445168 ||  || — || January 2, 2009 || Kitt Peak || Spacewatch || — || align=right data-sort-value="0.94" | 940 m || 
|-id=169 bgcolor=#fefefe
| 445169 ||  || — || January 8, 2009 || Kitt Peak || Spacewatch || — || align=right data-sort-value="0.69" | 690 m || 
|-id=170 bgcolor=#E9E9E9
| 445170 ||  || — || October 9, 2007 || Kitt Peak || Spacewatch || — || align=right | 1.2 km || 
|-id=171 bgcolor=#E9E9E9
| 445171 ||  || — || January 16, 2009 || Kitt Peak || Spacewatch || — || align=right data-sort-value="0.95" | 950 m || 
|-id=172 bgcolor=#E9E9E9
| 445172 ||  || — || January 16, 2009 || Kitt Peak || Spacewatch || — || align=right | 1.0 km || 
|-id=173 bgcolor=#E9E9E9
| 445173 ||  || — || January 16, 2009 || Kitt Peak || Spacewatch || — || align=right | 2.0 km || 
|-id=174 bgcolor=#fefefe
| 445174 ||  || — || January 1, 2009 || Mount Lemmon || Mount Lemmon Survey || — || align=right data-sort-value="0.86" | 860 m || 
|-id=175 bgcolor=#E9E9E9
| 445175 ||  || — || January 20, 2009 || Kitt Peak || Spacewatch || — || align=right | 1.6 km || 
|-id=176 bgcolor=#E9E9E9
| 445176 ||  || — || November 21, 2008 || Mount Lemmon || Mount Lemmon Survey || — || align=right | 1.4 km || 
|-id=177 bgcolor=#E9E9E9
| 445177 ||  || — || December 31, 2008 || Mount Lemmon || Mount Lemmon Survey || — || align=right data-sort-value="0.97" | 970 m || 
|-id=178 bgcolor=#E9E9E9
| 445178 ||  || — || January 31, 2009 || Kitt Peak || Spacewatch || — || align=right | 1.1 km || 
|-id=179 bgcolor=#E9E9E9
| 445179 ||  || — || January 16, 2005 || Kitt Peak || Spacewatch || — || align=right data-sort-value="0.79" | 790 m || 
|-id=180 bgcolor=#E9E9E9
| 445180 ||  || — || January 25, 2009 || Kitt Peak || Spacewatch || (5) || align=right data-sort-value="0.61" | 610 m || 
|-id=181 bgcolor=#E9E9E9
| 445181 ||  || — || January 25, 2009 || Kitt Peak || Spacewatch || — || align=right | 1.4 km || 
|-id=182 bgcolor=#E9E9E9
| 445182 ||  || — || January 31, 2009 || Mount Lemmon || Mount Lemmon Survey || — || align=right | 1.5 km || 
|-id=183 bgcolor=#E9E9E9
| 445183 ||  || — || January 16, 2009 || Kitt Peak || Spacewatch || — || align=right data-sort-value="0.90" | 900 m || 
|-id=184 bgcolor=#E9E9E9
| 445184 ||  || — || January 16, 2009 || Kitt Peak || Spacewatch || — || align=right data-sort-value="0.92" | 920 m || 
|-id=185 bgcolor=#fefefe
| 445185 ||  || — || January 31, 2009 || Kitt Peak || Spacewatch || — || align=right data-sort-value="0.74" | 740 m || 
|-id=186 bgcolor=#E9E9E9
| 445186 ||  || — || December 30, 2008 || Mount Lemmon || Mount Lemmon Survey || — || align=right | 2.3 km || 
|-id=187 bgcolor=#E9E9E9
| 445187 ||  || — || January 31, 2009 || Kitt Peak || Spacewatch || (5) || align=right data-sort-value="0.64" | 640 m || 
|-id=188 bgcolor=#E9E9E9
| 445188 ||  || — || January 15, 2009 || Kitt Peak || Spacewatch || — || align=right | 1.7 km || 
|-id=189 bgcolor=#E9E9E9
| 445189 ||  || — || January 30, 2009 || Mount Lemmon || Mount Lemmon Survey || — || align=right | 2.2 km || 
|-id=190 bgcolor=#E9E9E9
| 445190 ||  || — || February 2, 2009 || Moletai || K. Černis, J. Zdanavičius || — || align=right | 2.2 km || 
|-id=191 bgcolor=#E9E9E9
| 445191 ||  || — || February 3, 2009 || Kitt Peak || Spacewatch || — || align=right data-sort-value="0.78" | 780 m || 
|-id=192 bgcolor=#E9E9E9
| 445192 ||  || — || February 1, 2009 || Kitt Peak || Spacewatch || — || align=right | 3.1 km || 
|-id=193 bgcolor=#fefefe
| 445193 ||  || — || February 14, 2009 || Dauban || F. Kugel || — || align=right data-sort-value="0.82" | 820 m || 
|-id=194 bgcolor=#E9E9E9
| 445194 ||  || — || February 4, 2009 || Mount Lemmon || Mount Lemmon Survey || — || align=right | 2.0 km || 
|-id=195 bgcolor=#E9E9E9
| 445195 ||  || — || February 14, 2009 || Kitt Peak || Spacewatch || — || align=right | 2.3 km || 
|-id=196 bgcolor=#fefefe
| 445196 ||  || — || February 3, 2009 || Kitt Peak || Spacewatch || MAS || align=right data-sort-value="0.78" | 780 m || 
|-id=197 bgcolor=#E9E9E9
| 445197 ||  || — || February 25, 2009 || Dauban || F. Kugel || — || align=right | 1.1 km || 
|-id=198 bgcolor=#E9E9E9
| 445198 ||  || — || February 22, 2009 || Kitt Peak || Spacewatch || — || align=right | 1.8 km || 
|-id=199 bgcolor=#E9E9E9
| 445199 ||  || — || February 22, 2009 || Kitt Peak || Spacewatch || — || align=right data-sort-value="0.99" | 990 m || 
|-id=200 bgcolor=#E9E9E9
| 445200 ||  || — || February 22, 2009 || Kitt Peak || Spacewatch || — || align=right | 1.9 km || 
|}

445201–445300 

|-bgcolor=#fefefe
| 445201 ||  || — || January 1, 2009 || Kitt Peak || Spacewatch || — || align=right data-sort-value="0.91" | 910 m || 
|-id=202 bgcolor=#E9E9E9
| 445202 ||  || — || February 25, 2009 || Calar Alto || F. Hormuth || AEO || align=right | 1.1 km || 
|-id=203 bgcolor=#E9E9E9
| 445203 ||  || — || February 21, 2009 || Kitt Peak || Spacewatch || — || align=right | 1.0 km || 
|-id=204 bgcolor=#E9E9E9
| 445204 ||  || — || February 22, 2009 || Kitt Peak || Spacewatch || EUN || align=right | 1.4 km || 
|-id=205 bgcolor=#E9E9E9
| 445205 ||  || — || February 26, 2009 || Kitt Peak || Spacewatch || MIS || align=right | 2.8 km || 
|-id=206 bgcolor=#E9E9E9
| 445206 ||  || — || February 26, 2009 || Kitt Peak || Spacewatch || — || align=right | 1.4 km || 
|-id=207 bgcolor=#E9E9E9
| 445207 ||  || — || February 26, 2009 || Kitt Peak || Spacewatch || — || align=right | 1.1 km || 
|-id=208 bgcolor=#E9E9E9
| 445208 ||  || — || February 26, 2009 || Kitt Peak || Spacewatch || — || align=right | 2.2 km || 
|-id=209 bgcolor=#fefefe
| 445209 ||  || — || February 20, 2009 || Catalina || CSS || H || align=right data-sort-value="0.74" | 740 m || 
|-id=210 bgcolor=#E9E9E9
| 445210 ||  || — || October 18, 2007 || Mount Lemmon || Mount Lemmon Survey || — || align=right data-sort-value="0.80" | 800 m || 
|-id=211 bgcolor=#E9E9E9
| 445211 ||  || — || February 27, 2009 || Kitt Peak || Spacewatch || — || align=right | 1.2 km || 
|-id=212 bgcolor=#E9E9E9
| 445212 ||  || — || February 27, 2009 || Kitt Peak || Spacewatch || — || align=right data-sort-value="0.73" | 730 m || 
|-id=213 bgcolor=#E9E9E9
| 445213 ||  || — || April 6, 2005 || Mount Lemmon || Mount Lemmon Survey || — || align=right | 1.3 km || 
|-id=214 bgcolor=#E9E9E9
| 445214 ||  || — || February 19, 2009 || Kitt Peak || Spacewatch || — || align=right | 2.3 km || 
|-id=215 bgcolor=#E9E9E9
| 445215 ||  || — || March 15, 2009 || Kitt Peak || Spacewatch || — || align=right | 1.8 km || 
|-id=216 bgcolor=#E9E9E9
| 445216 ||  || — || March 15, 2009 || Kitt Peak || Spacewatch || — || align=right data-sort-value="0.85" | 850 m || 
|-id=217 bgcolor=#E9E9E9
| 445217 ||  || — || March 16, 2009 || Kitt Peak || Spacewatch || — || align=right data-sort-value="0.62" | 620 m || 
|-id=218 bgcolor=#fefefe
| 445218 ||  || — || February 24, 2009 || Kitt Peak || Spacewatch || H || align=right data-sort-value="0.57" | 570 m || 
|-id=219 bgcolor=#E9E9E9
| 445219 ||  || — || August 28, 2006 || Kitt Peak || Spacewatch || — || align=right | 1.9 km || 
|-id=220 bgcolor=#E9E9E9
| 445220 ||  || — || December 31, 2008 || Kitt Peak || Spacewatch || BRG || align=right | 1.8 km || 
|-id=221 bgcolor=#E9E9E9
| 445221 ||  || — || February 28, 2009 || Kitt Peak || Spacewatch || MAR || align=right data-sort-value="0.96" | 960 m || 
|-id=222 bgcolor=#E9E9E9
| 445222 ||  || — || March 28, 2009 || Mount Lemmon || Mount Lemmon Survey || — || align=right | 1.9 km || 
|-id=223 bgcolor=#E9E9E9
| 445223 ||  || — || February 27, 2009 || Kitt Peak || Spacewatch || — || align=right | 1.8 km || 
|-id=224 bgcolor=#E9E9E9
| 445224 ||  || — || September 25, 1998 || Kitt Peak || Spacewatch || — || align=right | 3.0 km || 
|-id=225 bgcolor=#E9E9E9
| 445225 ||  || — || March 16, 2009 || Kitt Peak || Spacewatch || MAR || align=right data-sort-value="0.96" | 960 m || 
|-id=226 bgcolor=#fefefe
| 445226 ||  || — || March 21, 2009 || Kitt Peak || Spacewatch || H || align=right data-sort-value="0.67" | 670 m || 
|-id=227 bgcolor=#E9E9E9
| 445227 ||  || — || April 17, 2009 || Kitt Peak || Spacewatch || — || align=right | 2.6 km || 
|-id=228 bgcolor=#E9E9E9
| 445228 ||  || — || April 18, 2009 || Kitt Peak || Spacewatch || — || align=right | 2.1 km || 
|-id=229 bgcolor=#E9E9E9
| 445229 ||  || — || December 31, 2008 || Kitt Peak || Spacewatch || — || align=right | 1.6 km || 
|-id=230 bgcolor=#fefefe
| 445230 ||  || — || April 17, 2009 || Catalina || CSS || H || align=right data-sort-value="0.85" | 850 m || 
|-id=231 bgcolor=#fefefe
| 445231 ||  || — || October 8, 2007 || Catalina || CSS || H || align=right data-sort-value="0.96" | 960 m || 
|-id=232 bgcolor=#fefefe
| 445232 ||  || — || March 19, 2009 || Mount Lemmon || Mount Lemmon Survey || H || align=right data-sort-value="0.78" | 780 m || 
|-id=233 bgcolor=#d6d6d6
| 445233 ||  || — || April 27, 2009 || Catalina || CSS || — || align=right | 3.3 km || 
|-id=234 bgcolor=#E9E9E9
| 445234 ||  || — || April 20, 2009 || Kitt Peak || Spacewatch || DOR || align=right | 2.4 km || 
|-id=235 bgcolor=#E9E9E9
| 445235 ||  || — || March 19, 2009 || Kitt Peak || Spacewatch || — || align=right | 1.9 km || 
|-id=236 bgcolor=#d6d6d6
| 445236 ||  || — || May 1, 2009 || Cerro Burek || Alianza S4 Obs. || — || align=right | 1.9 km || 
|-id=237 bgcolor=#fefefe
| 445237 ||  || — || May 2, 2009 || Mount Lemmon || Mount Lemmon Survey || H || align=right data-sort-value="0.88" | 880 m || 
|-id=238 bgcolor=#d6d6d6
| 445238 ||  || — || May 1, 2009 || Catalina || CSS || — || align=right | 3.6 km || 
|-id=239 bgcolor=#d6d6d6
| 445239 ||  || — || April 18, 2009 || Kitt Peak || Spacewatch || — || align=right | 2.5 km || 
|-id=240 bgcolor=#E9E9E9
| 445240 ||  || — || May 27, 2009 || Kitt Peak || Spacewatch || — || align=right | 2.1 km || 
|-id=241 bgcolor=#E9E9E9
| 445241 ||  || — || November 16, 2006 || Mount Lemmon || Mount Lemmon Survey || — || align=right | 2.3 km || 
|-id=242 bgcolor=#d6d6d6
| 445242 ||  || — || July 16, 2009 || La Sagra || OAM Obs. || — || align=right | 4.3 km || 
|-id=243 bgcolor=#d6d6d6
| 445243 ||  || — || July 27, 2009 || Kitt Peak || Spacewatch || THM || align=right | 2.3 km || 
|-id=244 bgcolor=#d6d6d6
| 445244 ||  || — || July 19, 2009 || Siding Spring || SSS || — || align=right | 3.3 km || 
|-id=245 bgcolor=#d6d6d6
| 445245 ||  || — || July 27, 2009 || Catalina || CSS || — || align=right | 4.2 km || 
|-id=246 bgcolor=#d6d6d6
| 445246 ||  || — || July 28, 2009 || Catalina || CSS || — || align=right | 3.3 km || 
|-id=247 bgcolor=#d6d6d6
| 445247 ||  || — || July 27, 2009 || Kitt Peak || Spacewatch || — || align=right | 3.6 km || 
|-id=248 bgcolor=#d6d6d6
| 445248 ||  || — || August 16, 2009 || Kitt Peak || Spacewatch || — || align=right | 3.2 km || 
|-id=249 bgcolor=#d6d6d6
| 445249 ||  || — || June 21, 2009 || Mount Lemmon || Mount Lemmon Survey || Tj (2.96) || align=right | 3.1 km || 
|-id=250 bgcolor=#d6d6d6
| 445250 ||  || — || August 27, 2009 || La Sagra || OAM Obs. || LIX || align=right | 3.9 km || 
|-id=251 bgcolor=#d6d6d6
| 445251 ||  || — || August 17, 2009 || Kitt Peak || Spacewatch || 7:4 || align=right | 2.8 km || 
|-id=252 bgcolor=#d6d6d6
| 445252 ||  || — || August 17, 2009 || Catalina || CSS || — || align=right | 4.2 km || 
|-id=253 bgcolor=#d6d6d6
| 445253 ||  || — || August 22, 2009 || Socorro || LINEAR || — || align=right | 3.7 km || 
|-id=254 bgcolor=#d6d6d6
| 445254 ||  || — || August 27, 2009 || Catalina || CSS || — || align=right | 3.3 km || 
|-id=255 bgcolor=#d6d6d6
| 445255 ||  || — || August 28, 2009 || Kitt Peak || Spacewatch || — || align=right | 2.7 km || 
|-id=256 bgcolor=#d6d6d6
| 445256 ||  || — || August 20, 2009 || Catalina || CSS || — || align=right | 4.4 km || 
|-id=257 bgcolor=#d6d6d6
| 445257 ||  || — || August 17, 2009 || Catalina || CSS || — || align=right | 3.1 km || 
|-id=258 bgcolor=#d6d6d6
| 445258 ||  || — || September 30, 2003 || Kitt Peak || Spacewatch || 7:4 || align=right | 3.4 km || 
|-id=259 bgcolor=#d6d6d6
| 445259 ||  || — || September 15, 2009 || Kitt Peak || Spacewatch || 7:4 || align=right | 3.3 km || 
|-id=260 bgcolor=#d6d6d6
| 445260 ||  || — || September 15, 2009 || Kitt Peak || Spacewatch || — || align=right | 2.7 km || 
|-id=261 bgcolor=#d6d6d6
| 445261 ||  || — || September 14, 2009 || Kitt Peak || Spacewatch || — || align=right | 3.4 km || 
|-id=262 bgcolor=#d6d6d6
| 445262 ||  || — || September 15, 2009 || Mount Lemmon || Mount Lemmon Survey || — || align=right | 3.6 km || 
|-id=263 bgcolor=#d6d6d6
| 445263 ||  || — || September 17, 2009 || Mount Lemmon || Mount Lemmon Survey || — || align=right | 3.2 km || 
|-id=264 bgcolor=#d6d6d6
| 445264 ||  || — || September 21, 2009 || Mount Lemmon || Mount Lemmon Survey || — || align=right | 4.7 km || 
|-id=265 bgcolor=#d6d6d6
| 445265 ||  || — || March 26, 2006 || Kitt Peak || Spacewatch || 7:4 || align=right | 4.1 km || 
|-id=266 bgcolor=#d6d6d6
| 445266 ||  || — || June 24, 2008 || Kitt Peak || Spacewatch || — || align=right | 4.0 km || 
|-id=267 bgcolor=#FFC2E0
| 445267 ||  || — || September 29, 2009 || Mount Lemmon || Mount Lemmon Survey || AMO || align=right data-sort-value="0.42" | 420 m || 
|-id=268 bgcolor=#d6d6d6
| 445268 ||  || — || August 16, 2009 || Kitt Peak || Spacewatch || THM || align=right | 2.8 km || 
|-id=269 bgcolor=#FA8072
| 445269 ||  || — || November 15, 2003 || Kitt Peak || Spacewatch || — || align=right data-sort-value="0.43" | 430 m || 
|-id=270 bgcolor=#d6d6d6
| 445270 ||  || — || September 16, 2009 || Mount Lemmon || Mount Lemmon Survey || — || align=right | 3.1 km || 
|-id=271 bgcolor=#d6d6d6
| 445271 ||  || — || September 27, 2009 || Catalina || CSS || — || align=right | 4.5 km || 
|-id=272 bgcolor=#d6d6d6
| 445272 ||  || — || September 27, 2009 || Mount Lemmon || Mount Lemmon Survey || EOS || align=right | 1.9 km || 
|-id=273 bgcolor=#d6d6d6
| 445273 ||  || — || September 22, 2009 || Mount Lemmon || Mount Lemmon Survey || 7:4 || align=right | 4.4 km || 
|-id=274 bgcolor=#d6d6d6
| 445274 ||  || — || September 26, 2009 || Socorro || LINEAR || — || align=right | 3.2 km || 
|-id=275 bgcolor=#fefefe
| 445275 ||  || — || September 26, 2009 || Kitt Peak || Spacewatch || — || align=right data-sort-value="0.83" | 830 m || 
|-id=276 bgcolor=#d6d6d6
| 445276 ||  || — || September 28, 2009 || Mount Lemmon || Mount Lemmon Survey || — || align=right | 3.3 km || 
|-id=277 bgcolor=#d6d6d6
| 445277 ||  || — || October 1, 2009 || Mount Lemmon || Mount Lemmon Survey || 7:4 || align=right | 4.3 km || 
|-id=278 bgcolor=#d6d6d6
| 445278 ||  || — || October 26, 2009 || Kitt Peak || Spacewatch || 7:4 || align=right | 5.8 km || 
|-id=279 bgcolor=#FA8072
| 445279 ||  || — || November 19, 2009 || Kitt Peak || Spacewatch || — || align=right | 1.6 km || 
|-id=280 bgcolor=#fefefe
| 445280 ||  || — || November 18, 2009 || Kitt Peak || Spacewatch || — || align=right data-sort-value="0.57" | 570 m || 
|-id=281 bgcolor=#fefefe
| 445281 ||  || — || October 16, 2009 || Mount Lemmon || Mount Lemmon Survey || — || align=right data-sort-value="0.66" | 660 m || 
|-id=282 bgcolor=#fefefe
| 445282 ||  || — || November 19, 2009 || Kitt Peak || Spacewatch || — || align=right data-sort-value="0.52" | 520 m || 
|-id=283 bgcolor=#fefefe
| 445283 ||  || — || February 6, 2007 || Mount Lemmon || Mount Lemmon Survey || critical || align=right data-sort-value="0.68" | 680 m || 
|-id=284 bgcolor=#fefefe
| 445284 ||  || — || November 23, 2009 || Mount Lemmon || Mount Lemmon Survey || — || align=right | 1.2 km || 
|-id=285 bgcolor=#fefefe
| 445285 ||  || — || November 11, 2009 || Kitt Peak || Spacewatch || — || align=right data-sort-value="0.75" | 750 m || 
|-id=286 bgcolor=#fefefe
| 445286 ||  || — || November 21, 2009 || Kitt Peak || Spacewatch || — || align=right data-sort-value="0.66" | 660 m || 
|-id=287 bgcolor=#d6d6d6
| 445287 ||  || — || November 22, 2009 || Kitt Peak || Spacewatch || 3:2 || align=right | 5.0 km || 
|-id=288 bgcolor=#d6d6d6
| 445288 ||  || — || November 16, 2009 || Mount Lemmon || Mount Lemmon Survey || 7:4 || align=right | 4.4 km || 
|-id=289 bgcolor=#fefefe
| 445289 ||  || — || December 15, 2009 || Mount Lemmon || Mount Lemmon Survey || — || align=right | 1.0 km || 
|-id=290 bgcolor=#fefefe
| 445290 ||  || — || December 27, 2006 || Mount Lemmon || Mount Lemmon Survey || — || align=right data-sort-value="0.60" | 600 m || 
|-id=291 bgcolor=#fefefe
| 445291 ||  || — || January 6, 2010 || Kitt Peak || Spacewatch || — || align=right data-sort-value="0.75" | 750 m || 
|-id=292 bgcolor=#fefefe
| 445292 ||  || — || January 6, 2010 || Kitt Peak || Spacewatch || — || align=right data-sort-value="0.60" | 600 m || 
|-id=293 bgcolor=#fefefe
| 445293 ||  || — || January 6, 2010 || Kitt Peak || Spacewatch || — || align=right data-sort-value="0.94" | 940 m || 
|-id=294 bgcolor=#fefefe
| 445294 ||  || — || January 8, 2010 || Kitt Peak || Spacewatch || — || align=right | 2.2 km || 
|-id=295 bgcolor=#fefefe
| 445295 ||  || — || November 21, 2009 || Mount Lemmon || Mount Lemmon Survey || — || align=right data-sort-value="0.93" | 930 m || 
|-id=296 bgcolor=#fefefe
| 445296 ||  || — || January 12, 2010 || WISE || WISE || — || align=right | 2.9 km || 
|-id=297 bgcolor=#E9E9E9
| 445297 ||  || — || January 26, 2010 || WISE || WISE || — || align=right | 2.0 km || 
|-id=298 bgcolor=#fefefe
| 445298 ||  || — || February 9, 2010 || Kitt Peak || Spacewatch || — || align=right data-sort-value="0.65" | 650 m || 
|-id=299 bgcolor=#fefefe
| 445299 ||  || — || January 17, 2010 || Kitt Peak || Spacewatch || — || align=right data-sort-value="0.63" | 630 m || 
|-id=300 bgcolor=#fefefe
| 445300 ||  || — || December 6, 2005 || Kitt Peak || Spacewatch || — || align=right data-sort-value="0.94" | 940 m || 
|}

445301–445400 

|-bgcolor=#fefefe
| 445301 ||  || — || February 14, 2010 || Mount Lemmon || Mount Lemmon Survey || V || align=right data-sort-value="0.57" | 570 m || 
|-id=302 bgcolor=#fefefe
| 445302 ||  || — || October 29, 2005 || Catalina || CSS || — || align=right data-sort-value="0.94" | 940 m || 
|-id=303 bgcolor=#E9E9E9
| 445303 ||  || — || February 14, 2010 || WISE || WISE || — || align=right | 2.6 km || 
|-id=304 bgcolor=#fefefe
| 445304 ||  || — || February 10, 2010 || Kitt Peak || Spacewatch || — || align=right data-sort-value="0.86" | 860 m || 
|-id=305 bgcolor=#FFC2E0
| 445305 ||  || — || February 18, 2010 || WISE || WISE || APOPHA || align=right data-sort-value="0.76" | 760 m || 
|-id=306 bgcolor=#E9E9E9
| 445306 ||  || — || February 18, 2010 || Mount Lemmon || Mount Lemmon Survey || — || align=right data-sort-value="0.90" | 900 m || 
|-id=307 bgcolor=#d6d6d6
| 445307 ||  || — || March 4, 2010 || WISE || WISE || 3:2 || align=right | 4.0 km || 
|-id=308 bgcolor=#fefefe
| 445308 Volov ||  ||  || March 7, 2010 || Plana || F. Fratev || — || align=right data-sort-value="0.88" | 880 m || 
|-id=309 bgcolor=#fefefe
| 445309 ||  || — || March 12, 2010 || LightBuckets || T. Vorobjov || — || align=right data-sort-value="0.82" | 820 m || 
|-id=310 bgcolor=#fefefe
| 445310 ||  || — || March 13, 2010 || Mount Lemmon || Mount Lemmon Survey || V || align=right data-sort-value="0.64" | 640 m || 
|-id=311 bgcolor=#fefefe
| 445311 ||  || — || March 14, 2010 || Kitt Peak || Spacewatch || — || align=right data-sort-value="0.72" | 720 m || 
|-id=312 bgcolor=#fefefe
| 445312 ||  || — || March 4, 2010 || Kitt Peak || Spacewatch || — || align=right data-sort-value="0.71" | 710 m || 
|-id=313 bgcolor=#E9E9E9
| 445313 ||  || — || March 15, 2010 || Kitt Peak || Spacewatch || — || align=right data-sort-value="0.89" | 890 m || 
|-id=314 bgcolor=#fefefe
| 445314 ||  || — || March 5, 2010 || Kitt Peak || Spacewatch || — || align=right data-sort-value="0.77" | 770 m || 
|-id=315 bgcolor=#E9E9E9
| 445315 ||  || — || March 17, 2010 || Kitt Peak || Spacewatch || — || align=right data-sort-value="0.77" | 770 m || 
|-id=316 bgcolor=#fefefe
| 445316 ||  || — || February 18, 2010 || Kitt Peak || Spacewatch || NYS || align=right data-sort-value="0.63" | 630 m || 
|-id=317 bgcolor=#fefefe
| 445317 ||  || — || September 22, 2008 || Mount Lemmon || Mount Lemmon Survey || — || align=right data-sort-value="0.75" | 750 m || 
|-id=318 bgcolor=#fefefe
| 445318 ||  || — || March 18, 2010 || Kitt Peak || Spacewatch || — || align=right data-sort-value="0.80" | 800 m || 
|-id=319 bgcolor=#fefefe
| 445319 ||  || — || March 30, 2010 || WISE || WISE || — || align=right | 1.4 km || 
|-id=320 bgcolor=#E9E9E9
| 445320 ||  || — || September 10, 2007 || Kitt Peak || Spacewatch || — || align=right data-sort-value="0.89" | 890 m || 
|-id=321 bgcolor=#fefefe
| 445321 ||  || — || April 9, 2010 || Catalina || CSS || — || align=right | 1.3 km || 
|-id=322 bgcolor=#E9E9E9
| 445322 ||  || — || March 15, 2010 || Catalina || CSS || — || align=right | 1.8 km || 
|-id=323 bgcolor=#E9E9E9
| 445323 ||  || — || April 7, 2010 || Catalina || CSS || — || align=right | 1.0 km || 
|-id=324 bgcolor=#E9E9E9
| 445324 ||  || — || April 9, 2010 || Mount Lemmon || Mount Lemmon Survey || — || align=right data-sort-value="0.94" | 940 m || 
|-id=325 bgcolor=#fefefe
| 445325 ||  || — || March 18, 2010 || Mount Lemmon || Mount Lemmon Survey || — || align=right data-sort-value="0.69" | 690 m || 
|-id=326 bgcolor=#E9E9E9
| 445326 ||  || — || April 13, 2010 || WISE || WISE || — || align=right | 1.7 km || 
|-id=327 bgcolor=#E9E9E9
| 445327 ||  || — || April 10, 2010 || Kitt Peak || Spacewatch || — || align=right | 1.3 km || 
|-id=328 bgcolor=#fefefe
| 445328 ||  || — || October 20, 2008 || Kitt Peak || Spacewatch || V || align=right data-sort-value="0.78" | 780 m || 
|-id=329 bgcolor=#fefefe
| 445329 ||  || — || January 23, 2006 || Socorro || LINEAR || — || align=right data-sort-value="0.79" | 790 m || 
|-id=330 bgcolor=#E9E9E9
| 445330 ||  || — || April 7, 2010 || Catalina || CSS || — || align=right | 2.6 km || 
|-id=331 bgcolor=#E9E9E9
| 445331 ||  || — || May 6, 2010 || Kitt Peak || Spacewatch || — || align=right | 1.4 km || 
|-id=332 bgcolor=#E9E9E9
| 445332 ||  || — || February 2, 2010 || WISE || WISE || — || align=right | 3.0 km || 
|-id=333 bgcolor=#E9E9E9
| 445333 ||  || — || May 7, 2010 || Kitt Peak || Spacewatch || — || align=right | 1.3 km || 
|-id=334 bgcolor=#E9E9E9
| 445334 ||  || — || May 4, 2010 || Kitt Peak || Spacewatch || — || align=right | 1.3 km || 
|-id=335 bgcolor=#E9E9E9
| 445335 ||  || — || April 6, 2010 || Kitt Peak || Spacewatch || — || align=right | 1.2 km || 
|-id=336 bgcolor=#E9E9E9
| 445336 ||  || — || May 12, 2010 || Kitt Peak || Spacewatch || — || align=right | 1.4 km || 
|-id=337 bgcolor=#fefefe
| 445337 ||  || — || October 20, 2008 || Kitt Peak || Spacewatch || NYS || align=right data-sort-value="0.72" | 720 m || 
|-id=338 bgcolor=#E9E9E9
| 445338 ||  || — || May 17, 2010 || Kitt Peak || Spacewatch || — || align=right | 1.4 km || 
|-id=339 bgcolor=#d6d6d6
| 445339 ||  || — || May 28, 2010 || WISE || WISE || — || align=right | 2.6 km || 
|-id=340 bgcolor=#d6d6d6
| 445340 ||  || — || June 8, 2010 || WISE || WISE || — || align=right | 3.8 km || 
|-id=341 bgcolor=#E9E9E9
| 445341 ||  || — || February 28, 2010 || WISE || WISE || — || align=right | 2.7 km || 
|-id=342 bgcolor=#d6d6d6
| 445342 ||  || — || June 10, 2010 || WISE || WISE || — || align=right | 2.4 km || 
|-id=343 bgcolor=#d6d6d6
| 445343 ||  || — || June 13, 2010 || WISE || WISE || EOS || align=right | 2.9 km || 
|-id=344 bgcolor=#E9E9E9
| 445344 ||  || — || June 18, 2010 || WISE || WISE || — || align=right | 2.4 km || 
|-id=345 bgcolor=#d6d6d6
| 445345 ||  || — || October 8, 2005 || Kitt Peak || Spacewatch || — || align=right | 2.3 km || 
|-id=346 bgcolor=#d6d6d6
| 445346 ||  || — || June 25, 2010 || WISE || WISE || — || align=right | 3.5 km || 
|-id=347 bgcolor=#d6d6d6
| 445347 ||  || — || June 26, 2010 || WISE || WISE || — || align=right | 3.0 km || 
|-id=348 bgcolor=#d6d6d6
| 445348 ||  || — || June 27, 2010 || WISE || WISE || — || align=right | 3.4 km || 
|-id=349 bgcolor=#d6d6d6
| 445349 ||  || — || June 30, 2010 || WISE || WISE || — || align=right | 3.0 km || 
|-id=350 bgcolor=#d6d6d6
| 445350 ||  || — || June 30, 2010 || WISE || WISE || — || align=right | 1.9 km || 
|-id=351 bgcolor=#d6d6d6
| 445351 ||  || — || February 17, 2007 || Kitt Peak || Spacewatch || — || align=right | 3.8 km || 
|-id=352 bgcolor=#d6d6d6
| 445352 ||  || — || July 7, 2010 || WISE || WISE || — || align=right | 4.8 km || 
|-id=353 bgcolor=#d6d6d6
| 445353 ||  || — || January 27, 2007 || Mount Lemmon || Mount Lemmon Survey || — || align=right | 2.9 km || 
|-id=354 bgcolor=#d6d6d6
| 445354 ||  || — || October 28, 2005 || Mount Lemmon || Mount Lemmon Survey || — || align=right | 3.0 km || 
|-id=355 bgcolor=#d6d6d6
| 445355 ||  || — || July 2, 2010 || WISE || WISE || EOS || align=right | 2.7 km || 
|-id=356 bgcolor=#d6d6d6
| 445356 ||  || — || July 12, 2010 || WISE || WISE || — || align=right | 3.1 km || 
|-id=357 bgcolor=#d6d6d6
| 445357 ||  || — || July 12, 2010 || WISE || WISE || — || align=right | 3.4 km || 
|-id=358 bgcolor=#d6d6d6
| 445358 ||  || — || July 13, 2010 || WISE || WISE || EOS || align=right | 3.5 km || 
|-id=359 bgcolor=#d6d6d6
| 445359 ||  || — || July 6, 2010 || Mount Lemmon || Mount Lemmon Survey || BRA || align=right | 2.0 km || 
|-id=360 bgcolor=#d6d6d6
| 445360 ||  || — || July 18, 2010 || WISE || WISE || — || align=right | 3.2 km || 
|-id=361 bgcolor=#d6d6d6
| 445361 ||  || — || September 30, 2005 || Mount Lemmon || Mount Lemmon Survey || — || align=right | 2.6 km || 
|-id=362 bgcolor=#d6d6d6
| 445362 ||  || — || July 20, 2010 || WISE || WISE || — || align=right | 3.2 km || 
|-id=363 bgcolor=#d6d6d6
| 445363 ||  || — || October 28, 2005 || Kitt Peak || Spacewatch || — || align=right | 5.1 km || 
|-id=364 bgcolor=#d6d6d6
| 445364 ||  || — || July 24, 2010 || WISE || WISE || — || align=right | 2.1 km || 
|-id=365 bgcolor=#d6d6d6
| 445365 ||  || — || September 10, 2004 || Socorro || LINEAR || Tj (2.99) || align=right | 4.2 km || 
|-id=366 bgcolor=#d6d6d6
| 445366 ||  || — || July 28, 2010 || WISE || WISE || — || align=right | 2.3 km || 
|-id=367 bgcolor=#d6d6d6
| 445367 ||  || — || July 30, 2010 || WISE || WISE || — || align=right | 2.8 km || 
|-id=368 bgcolor=#d6d6d6
| 445368 ||  || — || July 31, 2010 || WISE || WISE || — || align=right | 5.8 km || 
|-id=369 bgcolor=#E9E9E9
| 445369 ||  || — || July 19, 2010 || Siding Spring || SSS || — || align=right | 3.0 km || 
|-id=370 bgcolor=#E9E9E9
| 445370 ||  || — || August 7, 2010 || Črni Vrh || Črni Vrh || — || align=right | 1.8 km || 
|-id=371 bgcolor=#E9E9E9
| 445371 ||  || — || August 7, 2010 || La Sagra || OAM Obs. || — || align=right | 1.9 km || 
|-id=372 bgcolor=#d6d6d6
| 445372 ||  || — || August 4, 2010 || WISE || WISE || VER || align=right | 3.6 km || 
|-id=373 bgcolor=#d6d6d6
| 445373 ||  || — || November 3, 2005 || Mount Lemmon || Mount Lemmon Survey || — || align=right | 2.5 km || 
|-id=374 bgcolor=#d6d6d6
| 445374 ||  || — || August 6, 2010 || WISE || WISE || — || align=right | 5.1 km || 
|-id=375 bgcolor=#d6d6d6
| 445375 ||  || — || August 7, 2010 || WISE || WISE || — || align=right | 4.9 km || 
|-id=376 bgcolor=#d6d6d6
| 445376 ||  || — || August 8, 2010 || WISE || WISE || — || align=right | 3.0 km || 
|-id=377 bgcolor=#d6d6d6
| 445377 ||  || — || October 8, 2004 || Socorro || LINEAR || — || align=right | 5.5 km || 
|-id=378 bgcolor=#d6d6d6
| 445378 ||  || — || September 2, 2010 || Mount Lemmon || Mount Lemmon Survey || — || align=right | 3.3 km || 
|-id=379 bgcolor=#d6d6d6
| 445379 ||  || — || September 6, 2010 || Kitt Peak || Spacewatch || — || align=right | 2.2 km || 
|-id=380 bgcolor=#fefefe
| 445380 ||  || — || August 12, 2010 || Kitt Peak || Spacewatch || H || align=right data-sort-value="0.73" | 730 m || 
|-id=381 bgcolor=#d6d6d6
| 445381 ||  || — || September 9, 2010 || Kitt Peak || Spacewatch || EOS || align=right | 1.8 km || 
|-id=382 bgcolor=#FA8072
| 445382 ||  || — || October 1, 2005 || Catalina || CSS || H || align=right data-sort-value="0.58" | 580 m || 
|-id=383 bgcolor=#d6d6d6
| 445383 ||  || — || October 25, 2005 || Kitt Peak || Spacewatch || — || align=right | 2.5 km || 
|-id=384 bgcolor=#d6d6d6
| 445384 ||  || — || September 10, 2010 || Kitt Peak || Spacewatch || EOS || align=right | 1.8 km || 
|-id=385 bgcolor=#d6d6d6
| 445385 ||  || — || October 6, 2005 || Mount Lemmon || Mount Lemmon Survey || — || align=right | 2.7 km || 
|-id=386 bgcolor=#d6d6d6
| 445386 ||  || — || September 4, 1999 || Kitt Peak || Spacewatch || — || align=right | 2.3 km || 
|-id=387 bgcolor=#E9E9E9
| 445387 ||  || — || October 14, 2001 || Socorro || LINEAR || — || align=right | 2.9 km || 
|-id=388 bgcolor=#d6d6d6
| 445388 ||  || — || October 7, 2005 || Mount Lemmon || Mount Lemmon Survey || — || align=right | 1.8 km || 
|-id=389 bgcolor=#d6d6d6
| 445389 ||  || — || February 13, 2007 || Mount Lemmon || Mount Lemmon Survey || EOS || align=right | 1.8 km || 
|-id=390 bgcolor=#d6d6d6
| 445390 ||  || — || September 10, 2010 || Kitt Peak || Spacewatch || — || align=right | 2.8 km || 
|-id=391 bgcolor=#d6d6d6
| 445391 ||  || — || October 23, 2005 || Kitt Peak || Spacewatch || EOS || align=right | 1.8 km || 
|-id=392 bgcolor=#d6d6d6
| 445392 ||  || — || July 27, 2010 || WISE || WISE || — || align=right | 2.9 km || 
|-id=393 bgcolor=#d6d6d6
| 445393 ||  || — || January 17, 2007 || Kitt Peak || Spacewatch || HYG || align=right | 2.8 km || 
|-id=394 bgcolor=#d6d6d6
| 445394 ||  || — || September 2, 2010 || Mount Lemmon || Mount Lemmon Survey || TEL || align=right | 1.1 km || 
|-id=395 bgcolor=#d6d6d6
| 445395 ||  || — || October 5, 2005 || Kitt Peak || Spacewatch || — || align=right | 1.6 km || 
|-id=396 bgcolor=#E9E9E9
| 445396 ||  || — || September 29, 2010 || Kitt Peak || Spacewatch || HOF || align=right | 2.2 km || 
|-id=397 bgcolor=#d6d6d6
| 445397 ||  || — || October 24, 2005 || Kitt Peak || Spacewatch || THM || align=right | 2.0 km || 
|-id=398 bgcolor=#d6d6d6
| 445398 ||  || — || September 30, 2005 || Mount Lemmon || Mount Lemmon Survey || EOS || align=right | 2.1 km || 
|-id=399 bgcolor=#d6d6d6
| 445399 ||  || — || September 10, 2010 || Kitt Peak || Spacewatch || — || align=right | 2.6 km || 
|-id=400 bgcolor=#d6d6d6
| 445400 ||  || — || October 12, 2005 || Kitt Peak || Spacewatch || — || align=right | 2.1 km || 
|}

445401–445500 

|-bgcolor=#d6d6d6
| 445401 ||  || — || October 30, 2005 || Kitt Peak || Spacewatch || — || align=right | 2.3 km || 
|-id=402 bgcolor=#d6d6d6
| 445402 ||  || — || October 25, 2005 || Mount Lemmon || Mount Lemmon Survey || — || align=right | 1.7 km || 
|-id=403 bgcolor=#d6d6d6
| 445403 ||  || — || September 29, 2005 || Kitt Peak || Spacewatch || — || align=right | 2.8 km || 
|-id=404 bgcolor=#d6d6d6
| 445404 ||  || — || October 2, 2010 || Kitt Peak || Spacewatch || — || align=right | 2.1 km || 
|-id=405 bgcolor=#d6d6d6
| 445405 ||  || — || November 21, 2005 || Catalina || CSS || EOS || align=right | 2.0 km || 
|-id=406 bgcolor=#d6d6d6
| 445406 ||  || — || October 3, 2010 || Kitt Peak || Spacewatch || — || align=right | 2.2 km || 
|-id=407 bgcolor=#d6d6d6
| 445407 ||  || — || September 30, 2010 || Catalina || CSS || — || align=right | 3.0 km || 
|-id=408 bgcolor=#d6d6d6
| 445408 ||  || — || March 3, 1997 || Kitt Peak || Spacewatch || — || align=right | 2.3 km || 
|-id=409 bgcolor=#d6d6d6
| 445409 ||  || — || October 29, 2005 || Mount Lemmon || Mount Lemmon Survey || — || align=right | 2.7 km || 
|-id=410 bgcolor=#d6d6d6
| 445410 ||  || — || December 7, 2005 || Kitt Peak || Spacewatch || THM || align=right | 2.0 km || 
|-id=411 bgcolor=#d6d6d6
| 445411 ||  || — || October 13, 2005 || Kitt Peak || Spacewatch || — || align=right | 2.2 km || 
|-id=412 bgcolor=#d6d6d6
| 445412 ||  || — || October 8, 2005 || Kitt Peak || Spacewatch || — || align=right | 2.3 km || 
|-id=413 bgcolor=#d6d6d6
| 445413 ||  || — || March 1, 2008 || Kitt Peak || Spacewatch || — || align=right | 2.3 km || 
|-id=414 bgcolor=#d6d6d6
| 445414 ||  || — || September 10, 2010 || Kitt Peak || Spacewatch || EOS || align=right | 1.7 km || 
|-id=415 bgcolor=#d6d6d6
| 445415 ||  || — || March 27, 2008 || Mount Lemmon || Mount Lemmon Survey || — || align=right | 2.4 km || 
|-id=416 bgcolor=#d6d6d6
| 445416 ||  || — || March 16, 2007 || Kitt Peak || Spacewatch || — || align=right | 2.6 km || 
|-id=417 bgcolor=#d6d6d6
| 445417 ||  || — || October 11, 2010 || Mount Lemmon || Mount Lemmon Survey || — || align=right | 2.4 km || 
|-id=418 bgcolor=#d6d6d6
| 445418 ||  || — || October 11, 2010 || Mount Lemmon || Mount Lemmon Survey || EOS || align=right | 2.2 km || 
|-id=419 bgcolor=#E9E9E9
| 445419 ||  || — || November 13, 2006 || Kitt Peak || Spacewatch || — || align=right | 2.0 km || 
|-id=420 bgcolor=#d6d6d6
| 445420 ||  || — || November 11, 2005 || Kitt Peak || Spacewatch || — || align=right | 2.7 km || 
|-id=421 bgcolor=#d6d6d6
| 445421 ||  || — || December 25, 2005 || Mount Lemmon || Mount Lemmon Survey || THM || align=right | 2.1 km || 
|-id=422 bgcolor=#d6d6d6
| 445422 ||  || — || October 22, 2005 || Kitt Peak || Spacewatch || — || align=right | 1.9 km || 
|-id=423 bgcolor=#d6d6d6
| 445423 ||  || — || April 3, 2008 || Mount Lemmon || Mount Lemmon Survey || — || align=right | 2.6 km || 
|-id=424 bgcolor=#d6d6d6
| 445424 ||  || — || October 30, 2005 || Mount Lemmon || Mount Lemmon Survey || — || align=right | 2.5 km || 
|-id=425 bgcolor=#d6d6d6
| 445425 ||  || — || October 17, 2010 || Mount Lemmon || Mount Lemmon Survey || — || align=right | 2.5 km || 
|-id=426 bgcolor=#d6d6d6
| 445426 ||  || — || July 31, 2010 || WISE || WISE || — || align=right | 3.6 km || 
|-id=427 bgcolor=#d6d6d6
| 445427 ||  || — || October 14, 2010 || Mount Lemmon || Mount Lemmon Survey || — || align=right | 4.2 km || 
|-id=428 bgcolor=#d6d6d6
| 445428 ||  || — || October 28, 2010 || Catalina || CSS || — || align=right | 4.5 km || 
|-id=429 bgcolor=#d6d6d6
| 445429 ||  || — || October 28, 2010 || Kitt Peak || Spacewatch || — || align=right | 2.9 km || 
|-id=430 bgcolor=#d6d6d6
| 445430 ||  || — || October 12, 2010 || Mount Lemmon || Mount Lemmon Survey || EOS || align=right | 2.1 km || 
|-id=431 bgcolor=#d6d6d6
| 445431 ||  || — || December 2, 2005 || Kitt Peak || Spacewatch || — || align=right | 2.6 km || 
|-id=432 bgcolor=#d6d6d6
| 445432 ||  || — || October 25, 2005 || Kitt Peak || Spacewatch || EOS || align=right | 1.7 km || 
|-id=433 bgcolor=#d6d6d6
| 445433 ||  || — || October 12, 2010 || Mount Lemmon || Mount Lemmon Survey || TIR || align=right | 3.4 km || 
|-id=434 bgcolor=#d6d6d6
| 445434 ||  || — || January 27, 2007 || Mount Lemmon || Mount Lemmon Survey || — || align=right | 2.8 km || 
|-id=435 bgcolor=#d6d6d6
| 445435 ||  || — || October 11, 2010 || Mount Lemmon || Mount Lemmon Survey || EOS || align=right | 1.7 km || 
|-id=436 bgcolor=#d6d6d6
| 445436 ||  || — || March 5, 2008 || Mount Lemmon || Mount Lemmon Survey || — || align=right | 3.4 km || 
|-id=437 bgcolor=#d6d6d6
| 445437 ||  || — || December 24, 2005 || Socorro || LINEAR || — || align=right | 3.6 km || 
|-id=438 bgcolor=#d6d6d6
| 445438 ||  || — || October 19, 2010 || Mount Lemmon || Mount Lemmon Survey || — || align=right | 2.8 km || 
|-id=439 bgcolor=#d6d6d6
| 445439 ||  || — || July 26, 2010 || WISE || WISE || — || align=right | 2.7 km || 
|-id=440 bgcolor=#d6d6d6
| 445440 ||  || — || October 28, 2005 || Mount Lemmon || Mount Lemmon Survey || — || align=right | 3.1 km || 
|-id=441 bgcolor=#d6d6d6
| 445441 ||  || — || October 10, 2010 || Kitt Peak || Spacewatch || — || align=right | 2.5 km || 
|-id=442 bgcolor=#d6d6d6
| 445442 ||  || — || August 17, 2009 || Kitt Peak || Spacewatch || — || align=right | 3.3 km || 
|-id=443 bgcolor=#d6d6d6
| 445443 ||  || — || March 31, 2008 || Kitt Peak || Spacewatch || EOS || align=right | 2.0 km || 
|-id=444 bgcolor=#d6d6d6
| 445444 ||  || — || October 29, 2010 || Mount Lemmon || Mount Lemmon Survey || — || align=right | 3.1 km || 
|-id=445 bgcolor=#d6d6d6
| 445445 ||  || — || October 13, 2010 || Mount Lemmon || Mount Lemmon Survey || — || align=right | 3.5 km || 
|-id=446 bgcolor=#d6d6d6
| 445446 ||  || — || February 25, 2007 || Kitt Peak || Spacewatch || — || align=right | 2.7 km || 
|-id=447 bgcolor=#d6d6d6
| 445447 ||  || — || September 11, 2010 || Mount Lemmon || Mount Lemmon Survey || — || align=right | 2.1 km || 
|-id=448 bgcolor=#d6d6d6
| 445448 ||  || — || March 29, 2008 || Kitt Peak || Spacewatch || — || align=right | 3.5 km || 
|-id=449 bgcolor=#d6d6d6
| 445449 ||  || — || March 14, 2007 || Kitt Peak || Spacewatch || — || align=right | 2.7 km || 
|-id=450 bgcolor=#d6d6d6
| 445450 ||  || — || October 30, 2010 || Kitt Peak || Spacewatch || — || align=right | 3.2 km || 
|-id=451 bgcolor=#d6d6d6
| 445451 ||  || — || November 5, 2005 || Kitt Peak || Spacewatch || — || align=right | 2.5 km || 
|-id=452 bgcolor=#d6d6d6
| 445452 ||  || — || November 4, 2005 || Kitt Peak || Spacewatch || — || align=right | 3.7 km || 
|-id=453 bgcolor=#d6d6d6
| 445453 ||  || — || July 27, 2010 || WISE || WISE || — || align=right | 2.1 km || 
|-id=454 bgcolor=#d6d6d6
| 445454 ||  || — || October 12, 1999 || Socorro || LINEAR || — || align=right | 3.3 km || 
|-id=455 bgcolor=#d6d6d6
| 445455 ||  || — || November 1, 2005 || Mount Lemmon || Mount Lemmon Survey || — || align=right | 2.4 km || 
|-id=456 bgcolor=#d6d6d6
| 445456 ||  || — || August 8, 2010 || WISE || WISE || — || align=right | 3.6 km || 
|-id=457 bgcolor=#d6d6d6
| 445457 ||  || — || October 12, 2010 || Mount Lemmon || Mount Lemmon Survey || EOS || align=right | 1.7 km || 
|-id=458 bgcolor=#d6d6d6
| 445458 ||  || — || September 11, 2004 || Socorro || LINEAR || — || align=right | 4.0 km || 
|-id=459 bgcolor=#d6d6d6
| 445459 ||  || — || September 11, 2010 || Mount Lemmon || Mount Lemmon Survey || — || align=right | 4.2 km || 
|-id=460 bgcolor=#d6d6d6
| 445460 ||  || — || January 5, 2006 || Catalina || CSS || — || align=right | 3.5 km || 
|-id=461 bgcolor=#d6d6d6
| 445461 ||  || — || September 7, 2004 || Kitt Peak || Spacewatch || — || align=right | 2.5 km || 
|-id=462 bgcolor=#d6d6d6
| 445462 ||  || — || January 8, 2006 || Kitt Peak || Spacewatch || THM || align=right | 2.6 km || 
|-id=463 bgcolor=#d6d6d6
| 445463 ||  || — || November 10, 2005 || Mount Lemmon || Mount Lemmon Survey || — || align=right | 3.6 km || 
|-id=464 bgcolor=#d6d6d6
| 445464 ||  || — || November 28, 1999 || Kitt Peak || Spacewatch || — || align=right | 2.7 km || 
|-id=465 bgcolor=#d6d6d6
| 445465 ||  || — || November 5, 2010 || Kitt Peak || Spacewatch || — || align=right | 2.0 km || 
|-id=466 bgcolor=#d6d6d6
| 445466 ||  || — || October 24, 2005 || Kitt Peak || Spacewatch || EOS || align=right | 1.5 km || 
|-id=467 bgcolor=#d6d6d6
| 445467 ||  || — || October 11, 2010 || Catalina || CSS || — || align=right | 3.0 km || 
|-id=468 bgcolor=#d6d6d6
| 445468 ||  || — || September 11, 2010 || Mount Lemmon || Mount Lemmon Survey || — || align=right | 3.2 km || 
|-id=469 bgcolor=#d6d6d6
| 445469 ||  || — || November 3, 2010 || Mount Lemmon || Mount Lemmon Survey || — || align=right | 3.4 km || 
|-id=470 bgcolor=#d6d6d6
| 445470 ||  || — || October 15, 2004 || Kitt Peak || Spacewatch || HYG || align=right | 2.5 km || 
|-id=471 bgcolor=#d6d6d6
| 445471 ||  || — || October 17, 2010 || Mount Lemmon || Mount Lemmon Survey || — || align=right | 2.8 km || 
|-id=472 bgcolor=#d6d6d6
| 445472 ||  || — || September 18, 2010 || Mount Lemmon || Mount Lemmon Survey || — || align=right | 3.2 km || 
|-id=473 bgcolor=#C2E0FF
| 445473 ||  || — || November 11, 2010 || La Silla || D. L. Rabinowitz, M. E. Schwamb, S. Tourtellotte || SDO || align=right | 423 km || 
|-id=474 bgcolor=#d6d6d6
| 445474 ||  || — || September 17, 2004 || Kitt Peak || Spacewatch || THM || align=right | 1.8 km || 
|-id=475 bgcolor=#d6d6d6
| 445475 ||  || — || April 29, 2008 || Mount Lemmon || Mount Lemmon Survey || — || align=right | 4.6 km || 
|-id=476 bgcolor=#d6d6d6
| 445476 ||  || — || December 30, 2000 || Kitt Peak || Spacewatch || — || align=right | 2.5 km || 
|-id=477 bgcolor=#d6d6d6
| 445477 ||  || — || September 11, 2010 || Mount Lemmon || Mount Lemmon Survey || — || align=right | 3.2 km || 
|-id=478 bgcolor=#d6d6d6
| 445478 ||  || — || November 30, 2005 || Kitt Peak || Spacewatch || — || align=right | 1.9 km || 
|-id=479 bgcolor=#d6d6d6
| 445479 ||  || — || December 4, 2005 || Kitt Peak || Spacewatch || THM || align=right | 1.9 km || 
|-id=480 bgcolor=#d6d6d6
| 445480 ||  || — || November 30, 2005 || Kitt Peak || Spacewatch || — || align=right | 4.2 km || 
|-id=481 bgcolor=#d6d6d6
| 445481 ||  || — || October 5, 2004 || Kitt Peak || Spacewatch || — || align=right | 2.2 km || 
|-id=482 bgcolor=#d6d6d6
| 445482 ||  || — || November 6, 2010 || Mount Lemmon || Mount Lemmon Survey || HYG || align=right | 2.4 km || 
|-id=483 bgcolor=#d6d6d6
| 445483 ||  || — || October 4, 2004 || Kitt Peak || Spacewatch || — || align=right | 2.8 km || 
|-id=484 bgcolor=#d6d6d6
| 445484 ||  || — || October 22, 2005 || Kitt Peak || Spacewatch || — || align=right | 2.3 km || 
|-id=485 bgcolor=#d6d6d6
| 445485 ||  || — || October 29, 2010 || Mount Lemmon || Mount Lemmon Survey || — || align=right | 3.2 km || 
|-id=486 bgcolor=#d6d6d6
| 445486 ||  || — || November 2, 1999 || Kitt Peak || Spacewatch || — || align=right | 2.0 km || 
|-id=487 bgcolor=#d6d6d6
| 445487 ||  || — || November 2, 2010 || Kitt Peak || Spacewatch || — || align=right | 2.7 km || 
|-id=488 bgcolor=#d6d6d6
| 445488 ||  || — || October 4, 2004 || Kitt Peak || Spacewatch || — || align=right | 3.2 km || 
|-id=489 bgcolor=#d6d6d6
| 445489 ||  || — || October 30, 2010 || Mount Lemmon || Mount Lemmon Survey || — || align=right | 3.5 km || 
|-id=490 bgcolor=#d6d6d6
| 445490 ||  || — || November 4, 1999 || Kitt Peak || Spacewatch || — || align=right | 1.9 km || 
|-id=491 bgcolor=#d6d6d6
| 445491 ||  || — || November 29, 2005 || Kitt Peak || Spacewatch || VER || align=right | 3.3 km || 
|-id=492 bgcolor=#d6d6d6
| 445492 ||  || — || October 7, 2004 || Kitt Peak || Spacewatch || THM || align=right | 2.0 km || 
|-id=493 bgcolor=#d6d6d6
| 445493 ||  || — || November 29, 2005 || Kitt Peak || Spacewatch || EOS || align=right | 2.3 km || 
|-id=494 bgcolor=#d6d6d6
| 445494 ||  || — || November 6, 2010 || Kitt Peak || Spacewatch || — || align=right | 2.8 km || 
|-id=495 bgcolor=#d6d6d6
| 445495 ||  || — || November 7, 2010 || Kitt Peak || Spacewatch || THM || align=right | 2.3 km || 
|-id=496 bgcolor=#d6d6d6
| 445496 ||  || — || December 4, 1999 || Kitt Peak || Spacewatch || LIX || align=right | 3.6 km || 
|-id=497 bgcolor=#d6d6d6
| 445497 ||  || — || January 7, 2000 || Socorro || LINEAR || — || align=right | 5.0 km || 
|-id=498 bgcolor=#d6d6d6
| 445498 ||  || — || October 24, 2005 || Kitt Peak || Spacewatch || — || align=right | 2.7 km || 
|-id=499 bgcolor=#d6d6d6
| 445499 ||  || — || October 11, 2010 || Mount Lemmon || Mount Lemmon Survey || EOS || align=right | 1.8 km || 
|-id=500 bgcolor=#d6d6d6
| 445500 ||  || — || October 19, 2010 || Mount Lemmon || Mount Lemmon Survey || — || align=right | 2.7 km || 
|}

445501–445600 

|-bgcolor=#d6d6d6
| 445501 ||  || — || February 21, 2007 || Mount Lemmon || Mount Lemmon Survey || — || align=right | 2.5 km || 
|-id=502 bgcolor=#d6d6d6
| 445502 ||  || — || October 13, 2010 || Mount Lemmon || Mount Lemmon Survey ||  || align=right | 3.2 km || 
|-id=503 bgcolor=#d6d6d6
| 445503 ||  || — || October 13, 2010 || Mount Lemmon || Mount Lemmon Survey || VER || align=right | 2.8 km || 
|-id=504 bgcolor=#d6d6d6
| 445504 ||  || — || March 12, 2007 || Kitt Peak || Spacewatch || — || align=right | 3.4 km || 
|-id=505 bgcolor=#d6d6d6
| 445505 ||  || — || August 1, 2009 || Kitt Peak || Spacewatch || EOS || align=right | 2.4 km || 
|-id=506 bgcolor=#d6d6d6
| 445506 ||  || — || December 30, 2005 || Kitt Peak || Spacewatch || THM || align=right | 2.0 km || 
|-id=507 bgcolor=#d6d6d6
| 445507 ||  || — || November 10, 2010 || Mount Lemmon || Mount Lemmon Survey || — || align=right | 2.7 km || 
|-id=508 bgcolor=#d6d6d6
| 445508 ||  || — || November 10, 2010 || Mount Lemmon || Mount Lemmon Survey || — || align=right | 3.5 km || 
|-id=509 bgcolor=#d6d6d6
| 445509 ||  || — || November 15, 2010 || Mount Lemmon || Mount Lemmon Survey || — || align=right | 3.1 km || 
|-id=510 bgcolor=#d6d6d6
| 445510 ||  || — || October 25, 2005 || Mount Lemmon || Mount Lemmon Survey || — || align=right | 2.8 km || 
|-id=511 bgcolor=#d6d6d6
| 445511 ||  || — || November 1, 2010 || Kitt Peak || Spacewatch || — || align=right | 3.7 km || 
|-id=512 bgcolor=#d6d6d6
| 445512 ||  || — || February 2, 2006 || Kitt Peak || Spacewatch || — || align=right | 2.5 km || 
|-id=513 bgcolor=#d6d6d6
| 445513 ||  || — || September 4, 2010 || Kitt Peak || Spacewatch || — || align=right | 3.5 km || 
|-id=514 bgcolor=#fefefe
| 445514 ||  || — || October 14, 1999 || Socorro || LINEAR || H || align=right | 1.1 km || 
|-id=515 bgcolor=#d6d6d6
| 445515 ||  || — || December 3, 1999 || Kitt Peak || Spacewatch || — || align=right | 2.9 km || 
|-id=516 bgcolor=#d6d6d6
| 445516 ||  || — || September 28, 1994 || Kitt Peak || Spacewatch || — || align=right | 2.6 km || 
|-id=517 bgcolor=#d6d6d6
| 445517 ||  || — || June 20, 1998 || Kitt Peak || Spacewatch || — || align=right | 3.2 km || 
|-id=518 bgcolor=#d6d6d6
| 445518 ||  || — || December 28, 2005 || Kitt Peak || Spacewatch || — || align=right | 2.1 km || 
|-id=519 bgcolor=#d6d6d6
| 445519 ||  || — || July 30, 2009 || Catalina || CSS || — || align=right | 5.0 km || 
|-id=520 bgcolor=#d6d6d6
| 445520 ||  || — || December 2, 2010 || Kitt Peak || Spacewatch || — || align=right | 4.5 km || 
|-id=521 bgcolor=#fefefe
| 445521 ||  || — || January 5, 2003 || Socorro || LINEAR || H || align=right | 1.2 km || 
|-id=522 bgcolor=#d6d6d6
| 445522 ||  || — || October 29, 2010 || Mount Lemmon || Mount Lemmon Survey || VER || align=right | 3.2 km || 
|-id=523 bgcolor=#d6d6d6
| 445523 ||  || — || November 25, 2005 || Kitt Peak || Spacewatch || — || align=right | 2.4 km || 
|-id=524 bgcolor=#d6d6d6
| 445524 ||  || — || December 7, 1999 || Socorro || LINEAR || — || align=right | 3.0 km || 
|-id=525 bgcolor=#d6d6d6
| 445525 ||  || — || December 15, 2004 || Socorro || LINEAR || — || align=right | 3.9 km || 
|-id=526 bgcolor=#d6d6d6
| 445526 ||  || — || December 10, 2010 || Mount Lemmon || Mount Lemmon Survey || — || align=right | 3.1 km || 
|-id=527 bgcolor=#d6d6d6
| 445527 ||  || — || November 5, 2010 || Mount Lemmon || Mount Lemmon Survey || THB || align=right | 4.0 km || 
|-id=528 bgcolor=#fefefe
| 445528 ||  || — || December 29, 2010 || Catalina || CSS || H || align=right data-sort-value="0.98" | 980 m || 
|-id=529 bgcolor=#d6d6d6
| 445529 ||  || — || December 5, 2010 || Mount Lemmon || Mount Lemmon Survey || — || align=right | 3.3 km || 
|-id=530 bgcolor=#d6d6d6
| 445530 ||  || — || December 3, 2010 || Mount Lemmon || Mount Lemmon Survey || — || align=right | 4.2 km || 
|-id=531 bgcolor=#d6d6d6
| 445531 ||  || — || September 6, 2004 || Socorro || LINEAR || — || align=right | 4.2 km || 
|-id=532 bgcolor=#d6d6d6
| 445532 ||  || — || August 17, 2009 || Catalina || CSS || — || align=right | 3.3 km || 
|-id=533 bgcolor=#d6d6d6
| 445533 ||  || — || September 11, 2004 || Kitt Peak || Spacewatch || — || align=right | 2.7 km || 
|-id=534 bgcolor=#d6d6d6
| 445534 ||  || — || September 4, 2008 || Kitt Peak || Spacewatch || 3:2 || align=right | 4.8 km || 
|-id=535 bgcolor=#fefefe
| 445535 ||  || — || February 10, 2008 || Mount Lemmon || Mount Lemmon Survey || — || align=right data-sort-value="0.80" | 800 m || 
|-id=536 bgcolor=#fefefe
| 445536 ||  || — || February 25, 2011 || Kitt Peak || Spacewatch || — || align=right data-sort-value="0.54" | 540 m || 
|-id=537 bgcolor=#fefefe
| 445537 ||  || — || February 22, 2011 || Kitt Peak || Spacewatch || — || align=right data-sort-value="0.63" | 630 m || 
|-id=538 bgcolor=#fefefe
| 445538 ||  || — || August 7, 2008 || Kitt Peak || Spacewatch || — || align=right data-sort-value="0.78" | 780 m || 
|-id=539 bgcolor=#fefefe
| 445539 ||  || — || March 17, 2004 || Kitt Peak || Spacewatch || — || align=right data-sort-value="0.73" | 730 m || 
|-id=540 bgcolor=#fefefe
| 445540 ||  || — || July 2, 2008 || Kitt Peak || Spacewatch || — || align=right data-sort-value="0.61" | 610 m || 
|-id=541 bgcolor=#fefefe
| 445541 ||  || — || December 13, 2006 || Kitt Peak || Spacewatch || — || align=right data-sort-value="0.78" | 780 m || 
|-id=542 bgcolor=#fefefe
| 445542 ||  || — || February 25, 2011 || Mount Lemmon || Mount Lemmon Survey || — || align=right data-sort-value="0.68" | 680 m || 
|-id=543 bgcolor=#fefefe
| 445543 ||  || — || April 12, 2004 || Desert Eagle || W. K. Y. Yeung || (2076) || align=right data-sort-value="0.62" | 620 m || 
|-id=544 bgcolor=#fefefe
| 445544 ||  || — || August 28, 2005 || Kitt Peak || Spacewatch || — || align=right data-sort-value="0.68" | 680 m || 
|-id=545 bgcolor=#fefefe
| 445545 ||  || — || April 1, 2011 || Mount Lemmon || Mount Lemmon Survey || — || align=right data-sort-value="0.67" | 670 m || 
|-id=546 bgcolor=#fefefe
| 445546 ||  || — || March 13, 2011 || Mount Lemmon || Mount Lemmon Survey || — || align=right data-sort-value="0.71" | 710 m || 
|-id=547 bgcolor=#fefefe
| 445547 ||  || — || September 29, 2005 || Kitt Peak || Spacewatch || — || align=right data-sort-value="0.68" | 680 m || 
|-id=548 bgcolor=#fefefe
| 445548 ||  || — || March 29, 2011 || Kitt Peak || Spacewatch || — || align=right data-sort-value="0.80" | 800 m || 
|-id=549 bgcolor=#fefefe
| 445549 ||  || — || April 30, 2011 || Mount Lemmon || Mount Lemmon Survey || — || align=right data-sort-value="0.70" | 700 m || 
|-id=550 bgcolor=#fefefe
| 445550 ||  || — || July 9, 2005 || Kitt Peak || Spacewatch || — || align=right data-sort-value="0.56" | 560 m || 
|-id=551 bgcolor=#fefefe
| 445551 ||  || — || February 8, 2007 || Kitt Peak || Spacewatch || — || align=right data-sort-value="0.89" | 890 m || 
|-id=552 bgcolor=#fefefe
| 445552 ||  || — || March 19, 2004 || Socorro || LINEAR || — || align=right data-sort-value="0.63" | 630 m || 
|-id=553 bgcolor=#fefefe
| 445553 ||  || — || March 9, 2007 || Kitt Peak || Spacewatch || — || align=right data-sort-value="0.57" | 570 m || 
|-id=554 bgcolor=#fefefe
| 445554 ||  || — || May 21, 2004 || Kitt Peak || Spacewatch || — || align=right data-sort-value="0.77" | 770 m || 
|-id=555 bgcolor=#fefefe
| 445555 ||  || — || May 26, 2011 || Mount Lemmon || Mount Lemmon Survey || — || align=right data-sort-value="0.78" | 780 m || 
|-id=556 bgcolor=#fefefe
| 445556 ||  || — || October 26, 2005 || Kitt Peak || Spacewatch || — || align=right data-sort-value="0.86" | 860 m || 
|-id=557 bgcolor=#fefefe
| 445557 ||  || — || September 23, 2008 || Kitt Peak || Spacewatch || — || align=right | 3.9 km || 
|-id=558 bgcolor=#fefefe
| 445558 ||  || — || June 23, 2011 || Kitt Peak || Spacewatch || — || align=right | 1.1 km || 
|-id=559 bgcolor=#fefefe
| 445559 ||  || — || January 24, 2006 || Mount Lemmon || Mount Lemmon Survey || — || align=right data-sort-value="0.78" | 780 m || 
|-id=560 bgcolor=#fefefe
| 445560 ||  || — || June 11, 2011 || Mount Lemmon || Mount Lemmon Survey || — || align=right data-sort-value="0.88" | 880 m || 
|-id=561 bgcolor=#fefefe
| 445561 ||  || — || May 12, 2007 || Kitt Peak || Spacewatch || NYS || align=right data-sort-value="0.66" | 660 m || 
|-id=562 bgcolor=#fefefe
| 445562 ||  || — || March 14, 2007 || Mount Lemmon || Mount Lemmon Survey || NYS || align=right data-sort-value="0.66" | 660 m || 
|-id=563 bgcolor=#fefefe
| 445563 ||  || — || October 8, 2004 || Kitt Peak || Spacewatch || — || align=right data-sort-value="0.74" | 740 m || 
|-id=564 bgcolor=#fefefe
| 445564 ||  || — || July 3, 2011 || Mount Lemmon || Mount Lemmon Survey || — || align=right data-sort-value="0.82" | 820 m || 
|-id=565 bgcolor=#fefefe
| 445565 ||  || — || December 2, 2004 || Kitt Peak || Spacewatch || — || align=right data-sort-value="0.82" | 820 m || 
|-id=566 bgcolor=#E9E9E9
| 445566 ||  || — || September 12, 2007 || Kitt Peak || Spacewatch || KON || align=right | 1.6 km || 
|-id=567 bgcolor=#fefefe
| 445567 ||  || — || August 24, 2000 || Socorro || LINEAR || — || align=right data-sort-value="0.71" | 710 m || 
|-id=568 bgcolor=#fefefe
| 445568 ||  || — || December 22, 2008 || Mount Lemmon || Mount Lemmon Survey || — || align=right data-sort-value="0.78" | 780 m || 
|-id=569 bgcolor=#fefefe
| 445569 ||  || — || January 26, 2009 || Mount Lemmon || Mount Lemmon Survey || — || align=right | 1.0 km || 
|-id=570 bgcolor=#fefefe
| 445570 ||  || — || December 30, 2008 || Kitt Peak || Spacewatch || NYS || align=right data-sort-value="0.60" | 600 m || 
|-id=571 bgcolor=#fefefe
| 445571 ||  || — || August 23, 2007 || Kitt Peak || Spacewatch || — || align=right data-sort-value="0.86" | 860 m || 
|-id=572 bgcolor=#fefefe
| 445572 ||  || — || May 25, 2003 || Kitt Peak || Spacewatch || — || align=right data-sort-value="0.91" | 910 m || 
|-id=573 bgcolor=#E9E9E9
| 445573 ||  || — || August 1, 2011 || Siding Spring || SSS || — || align=right | 1.1 km || 
|-id=574 bgcolor=#E9E9E9
| 445574 ||  || — || October 14, 2007 || Mount Lemmon || Mount Lemmon Survey || critical || align=right data-sort-value="0.82" | 820 m || 
|-id=575 bgcolor=#E9E9E9
| 445575 ||  || — || September 21, 2007 || Kitt Peak || Spacewatch || — || align=right | 1.4 km || 
|-id=576 bgcolor=#E9E9E9
| 445576 ||  || — || September 22, 2003 || Kitt Peak || Spacewatch || (5)critical || align=right data-sort-value="0.49" | 490 m || 
|-id=577 bgcolor=#E9E9E9
| 445577 ||  || — || October 8, 2007 || Catalina || CSS || — || align=right data-sort-value="0.95" | 950 m || 
|-id=578 bgcolor=#fefefe
| 445578 ||  || — || January 29, 2009 || Kitt Peak || Spacewatch || — || align=right data-sort-value="0.52" | 520 m || 
|-id=579 bgcolor=#fefefe
| 445579 ||  || — || June 16, 2007 || Kitt Peak || Spacewatch || — || align=right | 2.2 km || 
|-id=580 bgcolor=#fefefe
| 445580 ||  || — || December 30, 2008 || Kitt Peak || Spacewatch || — || align=right data-sort-value="0.80" | 800 m || 
|-id=581 bgcolor=#fefefe
| 445581 ||  || — || September 5, 1996 || Kitt Peak || Spacewatch || — || align=right data-sort-value="0.73" | 730 m || 
|-id=582 bgcolor=#E9E9E9
| 445582 ||  || — || October 11, 2007 || Catalina || CSS || — || align=right data-sort-value="0.82" | 820 m || 
|-id=583 bgcolor=#E9E9E9
| 445583 ||  || — || August 10, 2007 || Kitt Peak || Spacewatch || — || align=right data-sort-value="0.94" | 940 m || 
|-id=584 bgcolor=#E9E9E9
| 445584 ||  || — || August 10, 2007 || Kitt Peak || Spacewatch || — || align=right data-sort-value="0.65" | 650 m || 
|-id=585 bgcolor=#E9E9E9
| 445585 ||  || — || October 6, 2007 || Socorro || LINEAR || — || align=right data-sort-value="0.67" | 670 m || 
|-id=586 bgcolor=#fefefe
| 445586 ||  || — || September 24, 2008 || Mount Lemmon || Mount Lemmon Survey || — || align=right data-sort-value="0.87" | 870 m || 
|-id=587 bgcolor=#E9E9E9
| 445587 ||  || — || September 18, 2011 || Mount Lemmon || Mount Lemmon Survey || — || align=right | 1.5 km || 
|-id=588 bgcolor=#E9E9E9
| 445588 ||  || — || March 1, 2009 || Mount Lemmon || Mount Lemmon Survey || — || align=right | 2.3 km || 
|-id=589 bgcolor=#fefefe
| 445589 ||  || — || December 21, 2008 || Mount Lemmon || Mount Lemmon Survey || — || align=right data-sort-value="0.66" | 660 m || 
|-id=590 bgcolor=#fefefe
| 445590 ||  || — || December 30, 2008 || Mount Lemmon || Mount Lemmon Survey || — || align=right | 1.1 km || 
|-id=591 bgcolor=#fefefe
| 445591 ||  || — || January 30, 2009 || Mount Lemmon || Mount Lemmon Survey || — || align=right | 1.0 km || 
|-id=592 bgcolor=#E9E9E9
| 445592 ||  || — || September 27, 2003 || Kitt Peak || Spacewatch || (5) || align=right data-sort-value="0.47" | 470 m || 
|-id=593 bgcolor=#E9E9E9
| 445593 ||  || — || November 19, 2003 || Kitt Peak || Spacewatch || — || align=right | 1.1 km || 
|-id=594 bgcolor=#E9E9E9
| 445594 ||  || — || October 12, 2007 || Mount Lemmon || Mount Lemmon Survey || (5) || align=right data-sort-value="0.69" | 690 m || 
|-id=595 bgcolor=#fefefe
| 445595 ||  || — || September 10, 2007 || Catalina || CSS || — || align=right | 1.0 km || 
|-id=596 bgcolor=#fefefe
| 445596 ||  || — || September 13, 2004 || Anderson Mesa || LONEOS || — || align=right | 1.0 km || 
|-id=597 bgcolor=#E9E9E9
| 445597 ||  || — || December 29, 2008 || Mount Lemmon || Mount Lemmon Survey || EUN || align=right | 1.3 km || 
|-id=598 bgcolor=#E9E9E9
| 445598 ||  || — || September 18, 2007 || Catalina || CSS || — || align=right data-sort-value="0.94" | 940 m || 
|-id=599 bgcolor=#E9E9E9
| 445599 ||  || — || September 11, 2007 || Mount Lemmon || Mount Lemmon Survey || — || align=right | 1.2 km || 
|-id=600 bgcolor=#E9E9E9
| 445600 ||  || — || April 12, 2005 || Kitt Peak || Spacewatch || — || align=right | 1.8 km || 
|}

445601–445700 

|-bgcolor=#E9E9E9
| 445601 ||  || — || October 30, 2007 || Catalina || CSS || — || align=right | 1.1 km || 
|-id=602 bgcolor=#E9E9E9
| 445602 ||  || — || March 9, 2005 || Mount Lemmon || Mount Lemmon Survey || — || align=right | 1.0 km || 
|-id=603 bgcolor=#E9E9E9
| 445603 ||  || — || November 19, 2007 || Kitt Peak || Spacewatch || — || align=right | 1.3 km || 
|-id=604 bgcolor=#E9E9E9
| 445604 ||  || — || November 3, 2007 || Catalina || CSS || — || align=right | 2.3 km || 
|-id=605 bgcolor=#fefefe
| 445605 ||  || — || April 9, 2010 || Kitt Peak || Spacewatch || — || align=right data-sort-value="0.85" | 850 m || 
|-id=606 bgcolor=#fefefe
| 445606 ||  || — || December 1, 2008 || Mount Lemmon || Mount Lemmon Survey || — || align=right | 1.2 km || 
|-id=607 bgcolor=#E9E9E9
| 445607 ||  || — || October 11, 2007 || Catalina || CSS || — || align=right data-sort-value="0.94" | 940 m || 
|-id=608 bgcolor=#fefefe
| 445608 ||  || — || November 20, 2000 || Kitt Peak || Spacewatch || — || align=right data-sort-value="0.86" | 860 m || 
|-id=609 bgcolor=#E9E9E9
| 445609 ||  || — || September 23, 2011 || Kitt Peak || Spacewatch || — || align=right | 1.4 km || 
|-id=610 bgcolor=#E9E9E9
| 445610 ||  || — || October 15, 2007 || Mount Lemmon || Mount Lemmon Survey || EUN || align=right | 1.1 km || 
|-id=611 bgcolor=#E9E9E9
| 445611 ||  || — || January 17, 2004 || Kitt Peak || Spacewatch || — || align=right | 1.8 km || 
|-id=612 bgcolor=#E9E9E9
| 445612 ||  || — || October 4, 2007 || Kitt Peak || Spacewatch || (5) || align=right data-sort-value="0.74" | 740 m || 
|-id=613 bgcolor=#fefefe
| 445613 ||  || — || May 11, 2002 || Socorro || LINEAR || — || align=right | 2.1 km || 
|-id=614 bgcolor=#E9E9E9
| 445614 ||  || — || October 15, 2007 || Kitt Peak || Spacewatch || (5) || align=right data-sort-value="0.56" | 560 m || 
|-id=615 bgcolor=#E9E9E9
| 445615 ||  || — || October 18, 2003 || Kitt Peak || Spacewatch || — || align=right data-sort-value="0.90" | 900 m || 
|-id=616 bgcolor=#E9E9E9
| 445616 ||  || — || October 4, 2003 || Kitt Peak || Spacewatch || — || align=right data-sort-value="0.94" | 940 m || 
|-id=617 bgcolor=#E9E9E9
| 445617 ||  || — || October 12, 2007 || Anderson Mesa || LONEOS || EUN || align=right | 1.1 km || 
|-id=618 bgcolor=#E9E9E9
| 445618 ||  || — || September 14, 2007 || Mount Lemmon || Mount Lemmon Survey || — || align=right | 1.5 km || 
|-id=619 bgcolor=#E9E9E9
| 445619 ||  || — || October 20, 2007 || Mount Lemmon || Mount Lemmon Survey || — || align=right | 1.1 km || 
|-id=620 bgcolor=#E9E9E9
| 445620 ||  || — || October 21, 2007 || Kitt Peak || Spacewatch || EUN || align=right | 1.3 km || 
|-id=621 bgcolor=#E9E9E9
| 445621 ||  || — || November 1, 2007 || Kitt Peak || Spacewatch || — || align=right | 1.5 km || 
|-id=622 bgcolor=#E9E9E9
| 445622 ||  || — || October 2, 2002 || Socorro || LINEAR || — || align=right | 1.7 km || 
|-id=623 bgcolor=#E9E9E9
| 445623 ||  || — || September 28, 2003 || Kitt Peak || Spacewatch || (5) || align=right data-sort-value="0.76" | 760 m || 
|-id=624 bgcolor=#fefefe
| 445624 ||  || — || January 31, 2006 || Kitt Peak || Spacewatch || — || align=right data-sort-value="0.92" | 920 m || 
|-id=625 bgcolor=#fefefe
| 445625 ||  || — || October 17, 1996 || Kitt Peak || Spacewatch || — || align=right | 1.2 km || 
|-id=626 bgcolor=#E9E9E9
| 445626 ||  || — || February 12, 2004 || Kitt Peak || Spacewatch || EUN || align=right | 1.2 km || 
|-id=627 bgcolor=#E9E9E9
| 445627 ||  || — || August 27, 2006 || Kitt Peak || Spacewatch || — || align=right | 1.8 km || 
|-id=628 bgcolor=#FA8072
| 445628 ||  || — || November 23, 2003 || Anderson Mesa || LONEOS || — || align=right data-sort-value="0.65" | 650 m || 
|-id=629 bgcolor=#E9E9E9
| 445629 ||  || — || September 26, 2011 || Kitt Peak || Spacewatch || — || align=right | 2.1 km || 
|-id=630 bgcolor=#fefefe
| 445630 ||  || — || July 18, 2007 || Mount Lemmon || Mount Lemmon Survey || — || align=right data-sort-value="0.72" | 720 m || 
|-id=631 bgcolor=#E9E9E9
| 445631 ||  || — || October 13, 2007 || Kitt Peak || Spacewatch || — || align=right data-sort-value="0.77" | 770 m || 
|-id=632 bgcolor=#E9E9E9
| 445632 ||  || — || March 8, 2005 || Mount Lemmon || Mount Lemmon Survey || (5) || align=right data-sort-value="0.72" | 720 m || 
|-id=633 bgcolor=#E9E9E9
| 445633 ||  || — || September 21, 2011 || Catalina || CSS || — || align=right | 2.8 km || 
|-id=634 bgcolor=#fefefe
| 445634 ||  || — || September 13, 2007 || Mount Lemmon || Mount Lemmon Survey || — || align=right data-sort-value="0.82" | 820 m || 
|-id=635 bgcolor=#E9E9E9
| 445635 ||  || — || September 21, 2011 || Kitt Peak || Spacewatch || — || align=right | 1.8 km || 
|-id=636 bgcolor=#E9E9E9
| 445636 ||  || — || May 14, 2005 || Kitt Peak || Spacewatch || — || align=right | 1.7 km || 
|-id=637 bgcolor=#E9E9E9
| 445637 ||  || — || September 28, 2006 || Kitt Peak || Spacewatch || — || align=right | 2.1 km || 
|-id=638 bgcolor=#E9E9E9
| 445638 ||  || — || September 20, 2011 || Kitt Peak || Spacewatch || — || align=right | 1.6 km || 
|-id=639 bgcolor=#E9E9E9
| 445639 ||  || — || April 9, 2010 || Kitt Peak || Spacewatch || — || align=right data-sort-value="0.98" | 980 m || 
|-id=640 bgcolor=#E9E9E9
| 445640 ||  || — || October 1, 2011 || Kitt Peak || Spacewatch || — || align=right | 1.4 km || 
|-id=641 bgcolor=#E9E9E9
| 445641 ||  || — || November 23, 1998 || Kitt Peak || Spacewatch || — || align=right | 1.3 km || 
|-id=642 bgcolor=#E9E9E9
| 445642 ||  || — || November 8, 2007 || Kitt Peak || Spacewatch || — || align=right data-sort-value="0.98" | 980 m || 
|-id=643 bgcolor=#E9E9E9
| 445643 ||  || — || August 19, 2006 || Kitt Peak || Spacewatch || AEO || align=right data-sort-value="0.97" | 970 m || 
|-id=644 bgcolor=#E9E9E9
| 445644 ||  || — || November 19, 2003 || Anderson Mesa || LONEOS || — || align=right data-sort-value="0.76" | 760 m || 
|-id=645 bgcolor=#E9E9E9
| 445645 ||  || — || April 2, 2006 || Kitt Peak || Spacewatch || — || align=right data-sort-value="0.99" | 990 m || 
|-id=646 bgcolor=#E9E9E9
| 445646 ||  || — || September 24, 2011 || Mount Lemmon || Mount Lemmon Survey || (5) || align=right data-sort-value="0.84" | 840 m || 
|-id=647 bgcolor=#E9E9E9
| 445647 ||  || — || October 18, 2011 || Mount Lemmon || Mount Lemmon Survey || — || align=right | 2.0 km || 
|-id=648 bgcolor=#E9E9E9
| 445648 ||  || — || October 19, 2011 || Mount Lemmon || Mount Lemmon Survey || — || align=right | 1.6 km || 
|-id=649 bgcolor=#E9E9E9
| 445649 ||  || — || November 3, 2007 || Kitt Peak || Spacewatch || — || align=right | 1.3 km || 
|-id=650 bgcolor=#E9E9E9
| 445650 ||  || — || October 18, 2011 || Kitt Peak || Spacewatch || — || align=right | 1.3 km || 
|-id=651 bgcolor=#E9E9E9
| 445651 ||  || — || March 31, 2009 || Mount Lemmon || Mount Lemmon Survey || — || align=right | 1.5 km || 
|-id=652 bgcolor=#E9E9E9
| 445652 ||  || — || February 13, 2004 || Kitt Peak || Spacewatch || MIS || align=right | 2.4 km || 
|-id=653 bgcolor=#E9E9E9
| 445653 ||  || — || October 30, 2007 || Kitt Peak || Spacewatch || — || align=right data-sort-value="0.95" | 950 m || 
|-id=654 bgcolor=#E9E9E9
| 445654 ||  || — || April 30, 2005 || Kitt Peak || Spacewatch || — || align=right | 2.2 km || 
|-id=655 bgcolor=#E9E9E9
| 445655 ||  || — || November 1, 2007 || Kitt Peak || Spacewatch || — || align=right | 1.5 km || 
|-id=656 bgcolor=#E9E9E9
| 445656 ||  || — || October 20, 2011 || Mount Lemmon || Mount Lemmon Survey || AGN || align=right | 1.0 km || 
|-id=657 bgcolor=#FA8072
| 445657 ||  || — || November 23, 1998 || Anderson Mesa || LONEOS || — || align=right | 1.4 km || 
|-id=658 bgcolor=#E9E9E9
| 445658 ||  || — || November 5, 2007 || Kitt Peak || Spacewatch || — || align=right | 1.4 km || 
|-id=659 bgcolor=#E9E9E9
| 445659 ||  || — || August 27, 2006 || Kitt Peak || Spacewatch || — || align=right | 1.6 km || 
|-id=660 bgcolor=#E9E9E9
| 445660 ||  || — || October 19, 2011 || Kitt Peak || Spacewatch || — || align=right | 1.6 km || 
|-id=661 bgcolor=#E9E9E9
| 445661 ||  || — || October 19, 2011 || Kitt Peak || Spacewatch || — || align=right | 2.3 km || 
|-id=662 bgcolor=#E9E9E9
| 445662 ||  || — || October 19, 2011 || Kitt Peak || Spacewatch || — || align=right | 1.7 km || 
|-id=663 bgcolor=#E9E9E9
| 445663 ||  || — || August 28, 2006 || Kitt Peak || Spacewatch || — || align=right | 1.9 km || 
|-id=664 bgcolor=#E9E9E9
| 445664 ||  || — || October 19, 2011 || Kitt Peak || Spacewatch || — || align=right | 1.8 km || 
|-id=665 bgcolor=#E9E9E9
| 445665 ||  || — || December 13, 2007 || Socorro || LINEAR || — || align=right | 1.1 km || 
|-id=666 bgcolor=#d6d6d6
| 445666 ||  || — || November 1, 2006 || Mount Lemmon || Mount Lemmon Survey || — || align=right | 2.4 km || 
|-id=667 bgcolor=#E9E9E9
| 445667 ||  || — || October 19, 2011 || Kitt Peak || Spacewatch || (5) || align=right data-sort-value="0.87" | 870 m || 
|-id=668 bgcolor=#E9E9E9
| 445668 ||  || — || October 20, 2011 || Mount Lemmon || Mount Lemmon Survey || — || align=right | 1.6 km || 
|-id=669 bgcolor=#E9E9E9
| 445669 ||  || — || December 16, 2007 || Mount Lemmon || Mount Lemmon Survey || — || align=right | 2.5 km || 
|-id=670 bgcolor=#E9E9E9
| 445670 ||  || — || December 17, 2003 || Socorro || LINEAR || — || align=right | 2.3 km || 
|-id=671 bgcolor=#E9E9E9
| 445671 ||  || — || December 18, 2003 || Kitt Peak || Spacewatch || — || align=right | 1.0 km || 
|-id=672 bgcolor=#E9E9E9
| 445672 ||  || — || November 5, 2007 || Kitt Peak || Spacewatch || — || align=right | 1.4 km || 
|-id=673 bgcolor=#E9E9E9
| 445673 ||  || — || September 29, 2011 || Mount Lemmon || Mount Lemmon Survey || MAR || align=right | 1.3 km || 
|-id=674 bgcolor=#E9E9E9
| 445674 ||  || — || October 19, 2011 || Mount Lemmon || Mount Lemmon Survey || — || align=right | 2.0 km || 
|-id=675 bgcolor=#E9E9E9
| 445675 ||  || — || December 5, 2007 || Kitt Peak || Spacewatch || AGN || align=right | 1.1 km || 
|-id=676 bgcolor=#E9E9E9
| 445676 ||  || — || September 21, 2011 || Kitt Peak || Spacewatch || — || align=right | 1.7 km || 
|-id=677 bgcolor=#E9E9E9
| 445677 ||  || — || September 29, 2011 || Mount Lemmon || Mount Lemmon Survey || — || align=right | 1.6 km || 
|-id=678 bgcolor=#E9E9E9
| 445678 ||  || — || June 17, 2010 || Mount Lemmon || Mount Lemmon Survey || — || align=right | 1.4 km || 
|-id=679 bgcolor=#E9E9E9
| 445679 ||  || — || October 21, 2011 || Mount Lemmon || Mount Lemmon Survey || — || align=right | 1.6 km || 
|-id=680 bgcolor=#E9E9E9
| 445680 ||  || — || September 28, 2011 || Kitt Peak || Spacewatch || — || align=right | 1.7 km || 
|-id=681 bgcolor=#E9E9E9
| 445681 ||  || — || September 23, 2011 || Mount Lemmon || Mount Lemmon Survey || — || align=right | 1.9 km || 
|-id=682 bgcolor=#E9E9E9
| 445682 ||  || — || December 4, 2007 || Kitt Peak || Spacewatch || — || align=right data-sort-value="0.98" | 980 m || 
|-id=683 bgcolor=#E9E9E9
| 445683 ||  || — || October 22, 2011 || Kitt Peak || Spacewatch || — || align=right | 1.4 km || 
|-id=684 bgcolor=#E9E9E9
| 445684 ||  || — || September 27, 2011 || Mount Lemmon || Mount Lemmon Survey || WIT || align=right | 1.0 km || 
|-id=685 bgcolor=#E9E9E9
| 445685 ||  || — || October 16, 2007 || Catalina || CSS || — || align=right | 1.4 km || 
|-id=686 bgcolor=#E9E9E9
| 445686 ||  || — || December 16, 2007 || Mount Lemmon || Mount Lemmon Survey || — || align=right | 1.9 km || 
|-id=687 bgcolor=#E9E9E9
| 445687 ||  || — || May 11, 2010 || Mount Lemmon || Mount Lemmon Survey || — || align=right | 2.0 km || 
|-id=688 bgcolor=#E9E9E9
| 445688 ||  || — || September 22, 1998 || Caussols || ODAS || — || align=right | 1.6 km || 
|-id=689 bgcolor=#E9E9E9
| 445689 ||  || — || October 28, 2006 || Kitt Peak || Spacewatch || — || align=right | 1.8 km || 
|-id=690 bgcolor=#E9E9E9
| 445690 ||  || — || October 24, 2011 || Socorro || LINEAR || EUN || align=right | 1.2 km || 
|-id=691 bgcolor=#E9E9E9
| 445691 ||  || — || October 21, 2011 || Mount Lemmon || Mount Lemmon Survey || (5) || align=right data-sort-value="0.82" | 820 m || 
|-id=692 bgcolor=#E9E9E9
| 445692 ||  || — || November 11, 2007 || Mount Lemmon || Mount Lemmon Survey || — || align=right | 1.2 km || 
|-id=693 bgcolor=#E9E9E9
| 445693 ||  || — || December 15, 2007 || Kitt Peak || Spacewatch || — || align=right data-sort-value="0.96" | 960 m || 
|-id=694 bgcolor=#E9E9E9
| 445694 ||  || — || November 8, 2007 || Socorro || LINEAR || — || align=right | 1.1 km || 
|-id=695 bgcolor=#E9E9E9
| 445695 ||  || — || February 29, 2004 || Kitt Peak || Spacewatch || — || align=right | 1.4 km || 
|-id=696 bgcolor=#E9E9E9
| 445696 ||  || — || September 28, 1994 || Kitt Peak || Spacewatch || — || align=right | 1.0 km || 
|-id=697 bgcolor=#E9E9E9
| 445697 ||  || — || October 20, 2011 || Mount Lemmon || Mount Lemmon Survey || WIT || align=right data-sort-value="0.85" | 850 m || 
|-id=698 bgcolor=#E9E9E9
| 445698 ||  || — || August 27, 2006 || Anderson Mesa || LONEOS || — || align=right | 1.9 km || 
|-id=699 bgcolor=#E9E9E9
| 445699 ||  || — || December 30, 2007 || Kitt Peak || Spacewatch || — || align=right | 1.9 km || 
|-id=700 bgcolor=#E9E9E9
| 445700 ||  || — || May 12, 2005 || Mount Lemmon || Mount Lemmon Survey || — || align=right | 1.6 km || 
|}

445701–445800 

|-bgcolor=#E9E9E9
| 445701 ||  || — || October 19, 2011 || Mount Lemmon || Mount Lemmon Survey || — || align=right | 1.3 km || 
|-id=702 bgcolor=#E9E9E9
| 445702 ||  || — || December 16, 2007 || Kitt Peak || Spacewatch || (5) || align=right | 1.00 km || 
|-id=703 bgcolor=#E9E9E9
| 445703 ||  || — || March 7, 2009 || Mount Lemmon || Mount Lemmon Survey || — || align=right | 1.8 km || 
|-id=704 bgcolor=#E9E9E9
| 445704 ||  || — || August 28, 2006 || Kitt Peak || Spacewatch || — || align=right | 2.3 km || 
|-id=705 bgcolor=#E9E9E9
| 445705 ||  || — || September 24, 2011 || Mount Lemmon || Mount Lemmon Survey || — || align=right | 1.7 km || 
|-id=706 bgcolor=#E9E9E9
| 445706 ||  || — || December 30, 2007 || Mount Lemmon || Mount Lemmon Survey || WIT || align=right data-sort-value="0.88" | 880 m || 
|-id=707 bgcolor=#E9E9E9
| 445707 ||  || — || October 25, 2011 || Kitt Peak || Spacewatch || — || align=right | 1.4 km || 
|-id=708 bgcolor=#E9E9E9
| 445708 ||  || — || September 15, 2007 || Mount Lemmon || Mount Lemmon Survey || — || align=right | 2.5 km || 
|-id=709 bgcolor=#E9E9E9
| 445709 ||  || — || October 27, 2006 || Kitt Peak || Spacewatch || — || align=right | 1.7 km || 
|-id=710 bgcolor=#E9E9E9
| 445710 ||  || — || October 22, 2011 || Kitt Peak || Spacewatch || — || align=right | 1.6 km || 
|-id=711 bgcolor=#E9E9E9
| 445711 ||  || — || September 17, 2006 || Kitt Peak || Spacewatch || DOR || align=right | 2.2 km || 
|-id=712 bgcolor=#E9E9E9
| 445712 ||  || — || November 9, 2007 || Kitt Peak || Spacewatch || — || align=right | 1.3 km || 
|-id=713 bgcolor=#E9E9E9
| 445713 ||  || — || November 19, 2007 || Kitt Peak || Spacewatch || — || align=right | 1.5 km || 
|-id=714 bgcolor=#E9E9E9
| 445714 ||  || — || October 23, 2011 || Kitt Peak || Spacewatch || — || align=right | 1.4 km || 
|-id=715 bgcolor=#E9E9E9
| 445715 ||  || — || October 18, 2011 || Kitt Peak || Spacewatch || — || align=right | 1.9 km || 
|-id=716 bgcolor=#E9E9E9
| 445716 ||  || — || October 18, 2011 || Catalina || CSS || — || align=right | 1.3 km || 
|-id=717 bgcolor=#E9E9E9
| 445717 ||  || — || November 7, 2007 || Kitt Peak || Spacewatch || — || align=right | 1.2 km || 
|-id=718 bgcolor=#E9E9E9
| 445718 ||  || — || December 16, 2007 || Mount Lemmon || Mount Lemmon Survey || — || align=right | 2.1 km || 
|-id=719 bgcolor=#E9E9E9
| 445719 ||  || — || October 20, 2011 || Mount Lemmon || Mount Lemmon Survey || AGN || align=right | 1.1 km || 
|-id=720 bgcolor=#E9E9E9
| 445720 ||  || — || April 22, 2009 || Mount Lemmon || Mount Lemmon Survey || NEM || align=right | 1.8 km || 
|-id=721 bgcolor=#E9E9E9
| 445721 ||  || — || January 16, 2008 || Kitt Peak || Spacewatch || MRX || align=right | 1.0 km || 
|-id=722 bgcolor=#E9E9E9
| 445722 ||  || — || February 20, 2009 || Kitt Peak || Spacewatch || — || align=right | 2.0 km || 
|-id=723 bgcolor=#E9E9E9
| 445723 ||  || — || October 20, 2011 || Mount Lemmon || Mount Lemmon Survey || — || align=right data-sort-value="0.88" | 880 m || 
|-id=724 bgcolor=#E9E9E9
| 445724 ||  || — || October 29, 2011 || Kitt Peak || Spacewatch || — || align=right | 1.2 km || 
|-id=725 bgcolor=#E9E9E9
| 445725 ||  || — || October 13, 1998 || Kitt Peak || Spacewatch || — || align=right | 1.3 km || 
|-id=726 bgcolor=#E9E9E9
| 445726 ||  || — || November 15, 2006 || Mount Lemmon || Mount Lemmon Survey || — || align=right | 2.4 km || 
|-id=727 bgcolor=#E9E9E9
| 445727 ||  || — || March 29, 2000 || Kitt Peak || Spacewatch || — || align=right | 1.2 km || 
|-id=728 bgcolor=#E9E9E9
| 445728 ||  || — || October 30, 2011 || Kitt Peak || Spacewatch || — || align=right | 1.4 km || 
|-id=729 bgcolor=#E9E9E9
| 445729 ||  || — || October 18, 2011 || Catalina || CSS || — || align=right | 2.0 km || 
|-id=730 bgcolor=#E9E9E9
| 445730 ||  || — || October 16, 2007 || Mount Lemmon || Mount Lemmon Survey || — || align=right data-sort-value="0.86" | 860 m || 
|-id=731 bgcolor=#E9E9E9
| 445731 ||  || — || August 26, 1998 || Kitt Peak || Spacewatch || — || align=right | 1.3 km || 
|-id=732 bgcolor=#E9E9E9
| 445732 ||  || — || December 31, 2007 || Kitt Peak || Spacewatch || — || align=right | 1.3 km || 
|-id=733 bgcolor=#E9E9E9
| 445733 ||  || — || November 2, 2007 || Kitt Peak || Spacewatch || — || align=right data-sort-value="0.94" | 940 m || 
|-id=734 bgcolor=#E9E9E9
| 445734 ||  || — || November 4, 2007 || Kitt Peak || Spacewatch || — || align=right | 1.0 km || 
|-id=735 bgcolor=#E9E9E9
| 445735 ||  || — || January 13, 2008 || Mount Lemmon || Mount Lemmon Survey || AGN || align=right | 1.2 km || 
|-id=736 bgcolor=#E9E9E9
| 445736 ||  || — || September 15, 2007 || Mount Lemmon || Mount Lemmon Survey || KON || align=right | 2.2 km || 
|-id=737 bgcolor=#E9E9E9
| 445737 ||  || — || December 17, 2007 || Mount Lemmon || Mount Lemmon Survey || — || align=right | 1.6 km || 
|-id=738 bgcolor=#E9E9E9
| 445738 ||  || — || March 4, 2005 || Mount Lemmon || Mount Lemmon Survey || EUN || align=right | 1.4 km || 
|-id=739 bgcolor=#E9E9E9
| 445739 ||  || — || September 27, 2011 || Kitt Peak || Spacewatch || — || align=right | 2.6 km || 
|-id=740 bgcolor=#E9E9E9
| 445740 ||  || — || September 13, 1998 || Kitt Peak || Spacewatch || — || align=right | 1.6 km || 
|-id=741 bgcolor=#E9E9E9
| 445741 ||  || — || October 2, 2002 || Socorro || LINEAR || — || align=right | 1.8 km || 
|-id=742 bgcolor=#E9E9E9
| 445742 ||  || — || January 15, 2004 || Kitt Peak || Spacewatch || — || align=right | 1.5 km || 
|-id=743 bgcolor=#E9E9E9
| 445743 ||  || — || December 19, 2003 || Socorro || LINEAR || — || align=right | 1.2 km || 
|-id=744 bgcolor=#E9E9E9
| 445744 ||  || — || January 16, 2008 || Kitt Peak || Spacewatch || — || align=right | 1.5 km || 
|-id=745 bgcolor=#E9E9E9
| 445745 ||  || — || September 28, 2006 || Kitt Peak || Spacewatch || — || align=right | 2.0 km || 
|-id=746 bgcolor=#E9E9E9
| 445746 ||  || — || August 29, 2006 || Kitt Peak || Spacewatch || — || align=right | 1.5 km || 
|-id=747 bgcolor=#E9E9E9
| 445747 ||  || — || October 18, 2011 || Mount Lemmon || Mount Lemmon Survey || WIT || align=right data-sort-value="0.85" | 850 m || 
|-id=748 bgcolor=#E9E9E9
| 445748 ||  || — || September 29, 1994 || Kitt Peak || Spacewatch || — || align=right data-sort-value="0.92" | 920 m || 
|-id=749 bgcolor=#d6d6d6
| 445749 ||  || — || October 1, 2005 || Catalina || CSS || — || align=right | 3.4 km || 
|-id=750 bgcolor=#E9E9E9
| 445750 ||  || — || October 15, 2007 || Mount Lemmon || Mount Lemmon Survey || — || align=right | 1.4 km || 
|-id=751 bgcolor=#E9E9E9
| 445751 ||  || — || December 5, 2007 || Kitt Peak || Spacewatch || — || align=right | 1.8 km || 
|-id=752 bgcolor=#E9E9E9
| 445752 ||  || — || November 17, 2007 || Mount Lemmon || Mount Lemmon Survey || — || align=right | 1.4 km || 
|-id=753 bgcolor=#d6d6d6
| 445753 ||  || — || January 9, 2002 || Socorro || LINEAR || — || align=right | 2.6 km || 
|-id=754 bgcolor=#E9E9E9
| 445754 ||  || — || February 12, 2004 || Kitt Peak || Spacewatch || — || align=right data-sort-value="0.82" | 820 m || 
|-id=755 bgcolor=#E9E9E9
| 445755 ||  || — || November 11, 2007 || Mount Lemmon || Mount Lemmon Survey || — || align=right | 1.1 km || 
|-id=756 bgcolor=#E9E9E9
| 445756 ||  || — || April 17, 2009 || Kitt Peak || Spacewatch || — || align=right | 1.8 km || 
|-id=757 bgcolor=#d6d6d6
| 445757 ||  || — || November 22, 2006 || Kitt Peak || Spacewatch || NAE || align=right | 2.0 km || 
|-id=758 bgcolor=#E9E9E9
| 445758 ||  || — || November 21, 2007 || Mount Lemmon || Mount Lemmon Survey || — || align=right data-sort-value="0.89" | 890 m || 
|-id=759 bgcolor=#E9E9E9
| 445759 ||  || — || September 18, 2006 || Kitt Peak || Spacewatch || — || align=right | 1.8 km || 
|-id=760 bgcolor=#E9E9E9
| 445760 ||  || — || December 19, 2007 || Mount Lemmon || Mount Lemmon Survey || — || align=right data-sort-value="0.99" | 990 m || 
|-id=761 bgcolor=#E9E9E9
| 445761 ||  || — || December 31, 2007 || Kitt Peak || Spacewatch || — || align=right | 1.4 km || 
|-id=762 bgcolor=#d6d6d6
| 445762 ||  || — || July 6, 2010 || Kitt Peak || Spacewatch || EOS || align=right | 1.8 km || 
|-id=763 bgcolor=#E9E9E9
| 445763 ||  || — || November 16, 2011 || Kitt Peak || Spacewatch || — || align=right | 2.1 km || 
|-id=764 bgcolor=#E9E9E9
| 445764 ||  || — || September 29, 2011 || Catalina || CSS || — || align=right | 1.7 km || 
|-id=765 bgcolor=#E9E9E9
| 445765 ||  || — || December 20, 1995 || Kitt Peak || Spacewatch || — || align=right | 1.1 km || 
|-id=766 bgcolor=#E9E9E9
| 445766 ||  || — || December 19, 2007 || Kitt Peak || Spacewatch || — || align=right | 1.4 km || 
|-id=767 bgcolor=#E9E9E9
| 445767 ||  || — || November 12, 2007 || Mount Lemmon || Mount Lemmon Survey || — || align=right | 1.5 km || 
|-id=768 bgcolor=#E9E9E9
| 445768 ||  || — || March 28, 2009 || Kitt Peak || Spacewatch || — || align=right | 1.9 km || 
|-id=769 bgcolor=#d6d6d6
| 445769 ||  || — || November 20, 2006 || Mount Lemmon || Mount Lemmon Survey || BRA || align=right | 1.9 km || 
|-id=770 bgcolor=#E9E9E9
| 445770 ||  || — || September 17, 2006 || Kitt Peak || Spacewatch || AGN || align=right data-sort-value="0.97" | 970 m || 
|-id=771 bgcolor=#E9E9E9
| 445771 ||  || — || January 10, 2008 || Mount Lemmon || Mount Lemmon Survey || — || align=right | 1.7 km || 
|-id=772 bgcolor=#E9E9E9
| 445772 ||  || — || January 11, 2008 || Kitt Peak || Spacewatch || HOF || align=right | 2.0 km || 
|-id=773 bgcolor=#E9E9E9
| 445773 ||  || — || January 17, 2009 || Kitt Peak || Spacewatch || — || align=right | 1.2 km || 
|-id=774 bgcolor=#E9E9E9
| 445774 ||  || — || December 14, 2007 || Socorro || LINEAR || — || align=right | 1.6 km || 
|-id=775 bgcolor=#FFC2E0
| 445775 ||  || — || December 16, 2011 || Catalina || CSS || APO || align=right data-sort-value="0.68" | 680 m || 
|-id=776 bgcolor=#E9E9E9
| 445776 ||  || — || November 16, 2011 || Mount Lemmon || Mount Lemmon Survey || — || align=right | 1.5 km || 
|-id=777 bgcolor=#FA8072
| 445777 ||  || — || March 22, 1999 || Anderson Mesa || LONEOS || — || align=right | 1.2 km || 
|-id=778 bgcolor=#d6d6d6
| 445778 ||  || — || March 12, 2008 || Kitt Peak || Spacewatch || — || align=right | 2.5 km || 
|-id=779 bgcolor=#d6d6d6
| 445779 ||  || — || July 20, 2010 || WISE || WISE || — || align=right | 3.0 km || 
|-id=780 bgcolor=#d6d6d6
| 445780 ||  || — || November 28, 2011 || Mount Lemmon || Mount Lemmon Survey || — || align=right | 3.5 km || 
|-id=781 bgcolor=#d6d6d6
| 445781 ||  || — || October 25, 2005 || Mount Lemmon || Mount Lemmon Survey || — || align=right | 2.6 km || 
|-id=782 bgcolor=#d6d6d6
| 445782 ||  || — || December 24, 2011 || Mount Lemmon || Mount Lemmon Survey || — || align=right | 2.1 km || 
|-id=783 bgcolor=#E9E9E9
| 445783 ||  || — || October 27, 2006 || Catalina || CSS || — || align=right | 2.2 km || 
|-id=784 bgcolor=#d6d6d6
| 445784 ||  || — || November 22, 2006 || Mount Lemmon || Mount Lemmon Survey || critical || align=right | 2.9 km || 
|-id=785 bgcolor=#d6d6d6
| 445785 ||  || — || December 31, 2011 || Kitt Peak || Spacewatch || — || align=right | 3.1 km || 
|-id=786 bgcolor=#d6d6d6
| 445786 ||  || — || February 17, 2007 || Mount Lemmon || Mount Lemmon Survey || — || align=right | 2.8 km || 
|-id=787 bgcolor=#E9E9E9
| 445787 ||  || — || December 19, 2003 || Kitt Peak || Spacewatch || — || align=right | 1.5 km || 
|-id=788 bgcolor=#d6d6d6
| 445788 ||  || — || September 13, 2004 || Socorro || LINEAR || EOS || align=right | 2.6 km || 
|-id=789 bgcolor=#d6d6d6
| 445789 ||  || — || December 12, 2006 || Mount Lemmon || Mount Lemmon Survey || — || align=right | 2.4 km || 
|-id=790 bgcolor=#d6d6d6
| 445790 ||  || — || August 7, 2010 || WISE || WISE || — || align=right | 5.5 km || 
|-id=791 bgcolor=#E9E9E9
| 445791 ||  || — || February 11, 2008 || Mount Lemmon || Mount Lemmon Survey || — || align=right | 2.5 km || 
|-id=792 bgcolor=#d6d6d6
| 445792 ||  || — || November 25, 2005 || Catalina || CSS || EOS || align=right | 1.9 km || 
|-id=793 bgcolor=#d6d6d6
| 445793 ||  || — || July 22, 2010 || WISE || WISE || — || align=right | 4.0 km || 
|-id=794 bgcolor=#d6d6d6
| 445794 ||  || — || February 20, 2001 || Socorro || LINEAR || — || align=right | 2.9 km || 
|-id=795 bgcolor=#E9E9E9
| 445795 ||  || — || October 19, 2006 || Mount Lemmon || Mount Lemmon Survey || NEM || align=right | 2.2 km || 
|-id=796 bgcolor=#d6d6d6
| 445796 ||  || — || September 12, 2004 || Kitt Peak || Spacewatch || — || align=right | 2.6 km || 
|-id=797 bgcolor=#d6d6d6
| 445797 ||  || — || January 21, 2001 || Kitt Peak || Spacewatch || — || align=right | 3.6 km || 
|-id=798 bgcolor=#d6d6d6
| 445798 ||  || — || December 26, 2011 || Kitt Peak || Spacewatch || — || align=right | 2.2 km || 
|-id=799 bgcolor=#d6d6d6
| 445799 ||  || — || March 12, 2007 || Mount Lemmon || Mount Lemmon Survey || — || align=right | 2.3 km || 
|-id=800 bgcolor=#d6d6d6
| 445800 ||  || — || February 25, 2007 || Mount Lemmon || Mount Lemmon Survey || VER || align=right | 2.7 km || 
|}

445801–445900 

|-bgcolor=#d6d6d6
| 445801 ||  || — || October 11, 2010 || Mount Lemmon || Mount Lemmon Survey || — || align=right | 3.7 km || 
|-id=802 bgcolor=#d6d6d6
| 445802 ||  || — || December 24, 2011 || Mount Lemmon || Mount Lemmon Survey || — || align=right | 2.8 km || 
|-id=803 bgcolor=#d6d6d6
| 445803 ||  || — || January 10, 2007 || Mount Lemmon || Mount Lemmon Survey || — || align=right | 3.2 km || 
|-id=804 bgcolor=#d6d6d6
| 445804 ||  || — || July 26, 2010 || WISE || WISE || — || align=right | 2.6 km || 
|-id=805 bgcolor=#d6d6d6
| 445805 ||  || — || January 18, 1996 || Kitt Peak || Spacewatch || — || align=right | 2.2 km || 
|-id=806 bgcolor=#d6d6d6
| 445806 ||  || — || October 25, 2005 || Kitt Peak || Spacewatch || — || align=right | 2.3 km || 
|-id=807 bgcolor=#d6d6d6
| 445807 ||  || — || February 6, 2007 || Mount Lemmon || Mount Lemmon Survey || — || align=right | 2.4 km || 
|-id=808 bgcolor=#d6d6d6
| 445808 ||  || — || December 28, 2005 || Mount Lemmon || Mount Lemmon Survey || — || align=right | 2.8 km || 
|-id=809 bgcolor=#E9E9E9
| 445809 ||  || — || January 10, 2007 || Socorro || LINEAR || DOR || align=right | 3.4 km || 
|-id=810 bgcolor=#E9E9E9
| 445810 ||  || — || November 17, 2006 || Kitt Peak || Spacewatch || — || align=right | 1.9 km || 
|-id=811 bgcolor=#d6d6d6
| 445811 ||  || — || May 3, 2008 || Mount Lemmon || Mount Lemmon Survey || — || align=right | 3.5 km || 
|-id=812 bgcolor=#d6d6d6
| 445812 ||  || — || January 27, 2012 || Kitt Peak || Spacewatch || EOS || align=right | 2.2 km || 
|-id=813 bgcolor=#d6d6d6
| 445813 ||  || — || March 14, 2005 || Mount Lemmon || Mount Lemmon Survey || SHU3:2 || align=right | 5.3 km || 
|-id=814 bgcolor=#d6d6d6
| 445814 ||  || — || September 3, 2010 || Mount Lemmon || Mount Lemmon Survey || — || align=right | 3.1 km || 
|-id=815 bgcolor=#d6d6d6
| 445815 ||  || — || July 27, 2010 || WISE || WISE || EOS || align=right | 3.5 km || 
|-id=816 bgcolor=#d6d6d6
| 445816 ||  || — || November 1, 2010 || Mount Lemmon || Mount Lemmon Survey || — || align=right | 2.1 km || 
|-id=817 bgcolor=#E9E9E9
| 445817 ||  || — || January 27, 2012 || Mount Lemmon || Mount Lemmon Survey || — || align=right | 2.2 km || 
|-id=818 bgcolor=#d6d6d6
| 445818 Ronbeck ||  ||  || July 25, 2010 || WISE || WISE || LIX || align=right | 4.1 km || 
|-id=819 bgcolor=#d6d6d6
| 445819 ||  || — || January 19, 2012 || Kitt Peak || Spacewatch || — || align=right | 3.1 km || 
|-id=820 bgcolor=#d6d6d6
| 445820 ||  || — || August 6, 2010 || WISE || WISE || — || align=right | 4.5 km || 
|-id=821 bgcolor=#d6d6d6
| 445821 ||  || — || September 23, 2005 || Kitt Peak || Spacewatch || — || align=right | 2.3 km || 
|-id=822 bgcolor=#d6d6d6
| 445822 ||  || — || November 12, 2010 || Mount Lemmon || Mount Lemmon Survey || — || align=right | 2.5 km || 
|-id=823 bgcolor=#d6d6d6
| 445823 ||  || — || November 21, 2005 || Catalina || CSS || EOS || align=right | 2.4 km || 
|-id=824 bgcolor=#d6d6d6
| 445824 ||  || — || January 28, 2007 || Mount Lemmon || Mount Lemmon Survey || — || align=right | 3.1 km || 
|-id=825 bgcolor=#d6d6d6
| 445825 ||  || — || October 2, 2010 || Kitt Peak || Spacewatch || — || align=right | 1.8 km || 
|-id=826 bgcolor=#d6d6d6
| 445826 ||  || — || November 10, 2010 || Mount Lemmon || Mount Lemmon Survey || VER || align=right | 3.4 km || 
|-id=827 bgcolor=#d6d6d6
| 445827 ||  || — || January 4, 2012 || Mount Lemmon || Mount Lemmon Survey || VER || align=right | 2.9 km || 
|-id=828 bgcolor=#d6d6d6
| 445828 ||  || — || August 10, 2009 || Kitt Peak || Spacewatch || — || align=right | 3.8 km || 
|-id=829 bgcolor=#d6d6d6
| 445829 ||  || — || October 25, 2005 || Kitt Peak || Spacewatch || — || align=right | 2.1 km || 
|-id=830 bgcolor=#FFC2E0
| 445830 ||  || — || February 11, 2012 || Mount Lemmon || Mount Lemmon Survey || APOcritical || align=right data-sort-value="0.13" | 130 m || 
|-id=831 bgcolor=#d6d6d6
| 445831 ||  || — || December 6, 2005 || Kitt Peak || Spacewatch || — || align=right | 3.1 km || 
|-id=832 bgcolor=#d6d6d6
| 445832 ||  || — || January 23, 2006 || Kitt Peak || Spacewatch || — || align=right | 3.0 km || 
|-id=833 bgcolor=#d6d6d6
| 445833 ||  || — || November 1, 2005 || Mount Lemmon || Mount Lemmon Survey || — || align=right | 2.5 km || 
|-id=834 bgcolor=#d6d6d6
| 445834 ||  || — || September 7, 2002 || Socorro || LINEAR || 7:4 || align=right | 3.7 km || 
|-id=835 bgcolor=#d6d6d6
| 445835 ||  || — || January 29, 2012 || Kitt Peak || Spacewatch || EOS || align=right | 2.2 km || 
|-id=836 bgcolor=#d6d6d6
| 445836 ||  || — || January 18, 2012 || Catalina || CSS || THB || align=right | 3.3 km || 
|-id=837 bgcolor=#d6d6d6
| 445837 ||  || — || August 9, 2010 || WISE || WISE || — || align=right | 3.3 km || 
|-id=838 bgcolor=#d6d6d6
| 445838 ||  || — || January 30, 2012 || Kitt Peak || Spacewatch || — || align=right | 3.5 km || 
|-id=839 bgcolor=#d6d6d6
| 445839 ||  || — || November 4, 2004 || Socorro || LINEAR || — || align=right | 3.7 km || 
|-id=840 bgcolor=#d6d6d6
| 445840 ||  || — || January 22, 2006 || Catalina || CSS || — || align=right | 3.4 km || 
|-id=841 bgcolor=#d6d6d6
| 445841 ||  || — || September 7, 2004 || Kitt Peak || Spacewatch || — || align=right | 2.5 km || 
|-id=842 bgcolor=#d6d6d6
| 445842 ||  || — || November 3, 2010 || Mount Lemmon || Mount Lemmon Survey || — || align=right | 3.6 km || 
|-id=843 bgcolor=#FA8072
| 445843 ||  || — || March 28, 2008 || Mount Lemmon || Mount Lemmon Survey || — || align=right | 1.5 km || 
|-id=844 bgcolor=#d6d6d6
| 445844 ||  || — || February 24, 2006 || Kitt Peak || Spacewatch || — || align=right | 3.5 km || 
|-id=845 bgcolor=#d6d6d6
| 445845 ||  || — || February 3, 2006 || Mount Lemmon || Mount Lemmon Survey || — || align=right | 2.7 km || 
|-id=846 bgcolor=#E9E9E9
| 445846 ||  || — || January 17, 2007 || Catalina || CSS || — || align=right | 2.3 km || 
|-id=847 bgcolor=#d6d6d6
| 445847 ||  || — || February 21, 2012 || Mount Lemmon || Mount Lemmon Survey || — || align=right | 2.7 km || 
|-id=848 bgcolor=#d6d6d6
| 445848 ||  || — || February 21, 2012 || Kitt Peak || Spacewatch || 3:2 || align=right | 4.5 km || 
|-id=849 bgcolor=#d6d6d6
| 445849 ||  || — || December 26, 2005 || Mount Lemmon || Mount Lemmon Survey || — || align=right | 2.5 km || 
|-id=850 bgcolor=#d6d6d6
| 445850 ||  || — || January 22, 2006 || Socorro || LINEAR || — || align=right | 2.9 km || 
|-id=851 bgcolor=#d6d6d6
| 445851 ||  || — || September 26, 2009 || Mount Lemmon || Mount Lemmon Survey || — || align=right | 3.7 km || 
|-id=852 bgcolor=#d6d6d6
| 445852 ||  || — || October 14, 2004 || Anderson Mesa || LONEOS || — || align=right | 4.3 km || 
|-id=853 bgcolor=#d6d6d6
| 445853 ||  || — || January 26, 2006 || Anderson Mesa || LONEOS || — || align=right | 3.5 km || 
|-id=854 bgcolor=#fefefe
| 445854 ||  || — || September 26, 2005 || Catalina || CSS || H || align=right data-sort-value="0.71" | 710 m || 
|-id=855 bgcolor=#d6d6d6
| 445855 ||  || — || November 17, 2010 || Mount Lemmon || Mount Lemmon Survey || — || align=right | 3.5 km || 
|-id=856 bgcolor=#d6d6d6
| 445856 ||  || — || November 13, 2010 || Kitt Peak || Spacewatch || — || align=right | 2.5 km || 
|-id=857 bgcolor=#fefefe
| 445857 ||  || — || November 2, 2010 || Mount Lemmon || Mount Lemmon Survey || H || align=right data-sort-value="0.89" | 890 m || 
|-id=858 bgcolor=#fefefe
| 445858 ||  || — || October 9, 2007 || Catalina || CSS || H || align=right data-sort-value="0.89" | 890 m || 
|-id=859 bgcolor=#fefefe
| 445859 ||  || — || October 23, 2006 || Mount Lemmon || Mount Lemmon Survey || — || align=right data-sort-value="0.58" | 580 m || 
|-id=860 bgcolor=#fefefe
| 445860 ||  || — || January 27, 2007 || Kitt Peak || Spacewatch || — || align=right data-sort-value="0.63" | 630 m || 
|-id=861 bgcolor=#fefefe
| 445861 ||  || — || October 6, 2012 || Mount Lemmon || Mount Lemmon Survey || — || align=right data-sort-value="0.76" | 760 m || 
|-id=862 bgcolor=#fefefe
| 445862 ||  || — || March 11, 2007 || Catalina || CSS || — || align=right data-sort-value="0.84" | 840 m || 
|-id=863 bgcolor=#fefefe
| 445863 ||  || — || January 27, 2007 || Mount Lemmon || Mount Lemmon Survey || — || align=right data-sort-value="0.61" | 610 m || 
|-id=864 bgcolor=#fefefe
| 445864 ||  || — || September 23, 2012 || Mount Lemmon || Mount Lemmon Survey || — || align=right data-sort-value="0.71" | 710 m || 
|-id=865 bgcolor=#fefefe
| 445865 ||  || — || January 10, 2007 || Mount Lemmon || Mount Lemmon Survey || — || align=right data-sort-value="0.50" | 500 m || 
|-id=866 bgcolor=#fefefe
| 445866 ||  || — || April 15, 2007 || Mount Lemmon || Mount Lemmon Survey || — || align=right data-sort-value="0.62" | 620 m || 
|-id=867 bgcolor=#fefefe
| 445867 ||  || — || October 16, 2009 || Kitt Peak || Spacewatch || — || align=right data-sort-value="0.57" | 570 m || 
|-id=868 bgcolor=#fefefe
| 445868 ||  || — || May 10, 2005 || Mount Lemmon || Mount Lemmon Survey || — || align=right data-sort-value="0.49" | 490 m || 
|-id=869 bgcolor=#fefefe
| 445869 ||  || — || December 16, 2009 || Mount Lemmon || Mount Lemmon Survey || — || align=right data-sort-value="0.62" | 620 m || 
|-id=870 bgcolor=#fefefe
| 445870 ||  || — || October 4, 1996 || Kitt Peak || Spacewatch || — || align=right data-sort-value="0.54" | 540 m || 
|-id=871 bgcolor=#fefefe
| 445871 ||  || — || November 16, 2009 || Kitt Peak || Spacewatch || — || align=right data-sort-value="0.55" | 550 m || 
|-id=872 bgcolor=#fefefe
| 445872 ||  || — || April 6, 2011 || Kitt Peak || Spacewatch || — || align=right data-sort-value="0.71" | 710 m || 
|-id=873 bgcolor=#fefefe
| 445873 ||  || — || September 14, 2012 || Kitt Peak || Spacewatch || — || align=right data-sort-value="0.54" | 540 m || 
|-id=874 bgcolor=#fefefe
| 445874 ||  || — || October 15, 2012 || Kitt Peak || Spacewatch || — || align=right data-sort-value="0.79" | 790 m || 
|-id=875 bgcolor=#fefefe
| 445875 ||  || — || October 15, 2012 || Mount Lemmon || Mount Lemmon Survey || — || align=right data-sort-value="0.74" | 740 m || 
|-id=876 bgcolor=#fefefe
| 445876 ||  || — || December 25, 2009 || Kitt Peak || Spacewatch || V || align=right data-sort-value="0.62" | 620 m || 
|-id=877 bgcolor=#fefefe
| 445877 ||  || — || November 16, 2009 || Mount Lemmon || Mount Lemmon Survey || — || align=right data-sort-value="0.55" | 550 m || 
|-id=878 bgcolor=#fefefe
| 445878 ||  || — || October 13, 2012 || Kitt Peak || Spacewatch || — || align=right data-sort-value="0.55" | 550 m || 
|-id=879 bgcolor=#fefefe
| 445879 ||  || — || November 9, 1999 || Kitt Peak || Spacewatch || — || align=right data-sort-value="0.63" | 630 m || 
|-id=880 bgcolor=#fefefe
| 445880 ||  || — || November 17, 2006 || Kitt Peak || Spacewatch || — || align=right data-sort-value="0.53" | 530 m || 
|-id=881 bgcolor=#fefefe
| 445881 ||  || — || November 23, 2009 || Kitt Peak || Spacewatch || — || align=right data-sort-value="0.60" | 600 m || 
|-id=882 bgcolor=#fefefe
| 445882 ||  || — || December 8, 2005 || Kitt Peak || Spacewatch || — || align=right data-sort-value="0.72" | 720 m || 
|-id=883 bgcolor=#fefefe
| 445883 ||  || — || November 17, 2009 || Kitt Peak || Spacewatch || — || align=right data-sort-value="0.63" | 630 m || 
|-id=884 bgcolor=#fefefe
| 445884 ||  || — || December 17, 2009 || Kitt Peak || Spacewatch || — || align=right data-sort-value="0.70" | 700 m || 
|-id=885 bgcolor=#fefefe
| 445885 ||  || — || March 30, 2008 || Kitt Peak || Spacewatch || — || align=right data-sort-value="0.64" | 640 m || 
|-id=886 bgcolor=#fefefe
| 445886 ||  || — || December 19, 2009 || Kitt Peak || Spacewatch || — || align=right data-sort-value="0.79" | 790 m || 
|-id=887 bgcolor=#fefefe
| 445887 ||  || — || November 29, 2005 || Kitt Peak || Spacewatch || — || align=right data-sort-value="0.71" | 710 m || 
|-id=888 bgcolor=#fefefe
| 445888 ||  || — || December 15, 2009 || Mount Lemmon || Mount Lemmon Survey || — || align=right data-sort-value="0.61" | 610 m || 
|-id=889 bgcolor=#fefefe
| 445889 ||  || — || March 12, 2010 || Kitt Peak || Spacewatch || NYS || align=right data-sort-value="0.69" | 690 m || 
|-id=890 bgcolor=#fefefe
| 445890 ||  || — || November 30, 2005 || Kitt Peak || Spacewatch || — || align=right data-sort-value="0.65" | 650 m || 
|-id=891 bgcolor=#fefefe
| 445891 ||  || — || January 10, 2007 || Mount Lemmon || Mount Lemmon Survey || — || align=right data-sort-value="0.49" | 490 m || 
|-id=892 bgcolor=#fefefe
| 445892 ||  || — || July 3, 2005 || Mount Lemmon || Mount Lemmon Survey || — || align=right data-sort-value="0.63" | 630 m || 
|-id=893 bgcolor=#fefefe
| 445893 ||  || — || September 4, 1999 || Kitt Peak || Spacewatch || — || align=right data-sort-value="0.57" | 570 m || 
|-id=894 bgcolor=#fefefe
| 445894 ||  || — || November 6, 2012 || Mount Lemmon || Mount Lemmon Survey || — || align=right data-sort-value="0.84" | 840 m || 
|-id=895 bgcolor=#fefefe
| 445895 ||  || — || April 5, 2011 || Kitt Peak || Spacewatch || — || align=right data-sort-value="0.90" | 900 m || 
|-id=896 bgcolor=#fefefe
| 445896 ||  || — || October 20, 2012 || Kitt Peak || Spacewatch || — || align=right data-sort-value="0.71" | 710 m || 
|-id=897 bgcolor=#fefefe
| 445897 ||  || — || December 22, 2005 || Kitt Peak || Spacewatch || — || align=right data-sort-value="0.68" | 680 m || 
|-id=898 bgcolor=#fefefe
| 445898 ||  || — || February 23, 2007 || Mount Lemmon || Mount Lemmon Survey || — || align=right data-sort-value="0.66" | 660 m || 
|-id=899 bgcolor=#fefefe
| 445899 ||  || — || March 29, 2011 || Kitt Peak || Spacewatch || — || align=right data-sort-value="0.94" | 940 m || 
|-id=900 bgcolor=#FA8072
| 445900 ||  || — || December 16, 2009 || Kitt Peak || Spacewatch || — || align=right data-sort-value="0.80" | 800 m || 
|}

445901–446000 

|-bgcolor=#fefefe
| 445901 ||  || — || October 1, 2005 || Kitt Peak || Spacewatch || — || align=right data-sort-value="0.65" | 650 m || 
|-id=902 bgcolor=#fefefe
| 445902 ||  || — || November 10, 2009 || Mount Lemmon || Mount Lemmon Survey || — || align=right data-sort-value="0.87" | 870 m || 
|-id=903 bgcolor=#fefefe
| 445903 ||  || — || October 14, 2012 || Kitt Peak || Spacewatch || — || align=right data-sort-value="0.73" | 730 m || 
|-id=904 bgcolor=#fefefe
| 445904 ||  || — || October 27, 2005 || Mount Lemmon || Mount Lemmon Survey || — || align=right data-sort-value="0.57" | 570 m || 
|-id=905 bgcolor=#fefefe
| 445905 ||  || — || July 29, 2008 || Kitt Peak || Spacewatch || — || align=right data-sort-value="0.82" | 820 m || 
|-id=906 bgcolor=#fefefe
| 445906 ||  || — || March 9, 2007 || Mount Lemmon || Mount Lemmon Survey || — || align=right data-sort-value="0.63" | 630 m || 
|-id=907 bgcolor=#E9E9E9
| 445907 ||  || — || September 14, 2007 || Catalina || CSS || — || align=right | 2.9 km || 
|-id=908 bgcolor=#fefefe
| 445908 ||  || — || November 7, 2012 || Kitt Peak || Spacewatch || — || align=right data-sort-value="0.70" | 700 m || 
|-id=909 bgcolor=#fefefe
| 445909 ||  || — || March 9, 2007 || Mount Lemmon || Mount Lemmon Survey || — || align=right data-sort-value="0.56" | 560 m || 
|-id=910 bgcolor=#fefefe
| 445910 ||  || — || November 28, 2005 || Mount Lemmon || Mount Lemmon Survey || — || align=right | 2.5 km || 
|-id=911 bgcolor=#fefefe
| 445911 ||  || — || November 1, 2005 || Mount Lemmon || Mount Lemmon Survey || — || align=right data-sort-value="0.88" | 880 m || 
|-id=912 bgcolor=#fefefe
| 445912 ||  || — || December 15, 2001 || Socorro || LINEAR || — || align=right | 1.3 km || 
|-id=913 bgcolor=#fefefe
| 445913 ||  || — || November 3, 2005 || Kitt Peak || Spacewatch || — || align=right data-sort-value="0.68" | 680 m || 
|-id=914 bgcolor=#fefefe
| 445914 ||  || — || February 1, 2003 || Kitt Peak || Spacewatch || — || align=right | 1.9 km || 
|-id=915 bgcolor=#fefefe
| 445915 ||  || — || October 22, 2005 || Catalina || CSS || — || align=right data-sort-value="0.80" | 800 m || 
|-id=916 bgcolor=#fefefe
| 445916 ||  || — || October 24, 1995 || Kitt Peak || Spacewatch || — || align=right data-sort-value="0.57" | 570 m || 
|-id=917 bgcolor=#E9E9E9
| 445917 Ola ||  ||  || December 5, 2012 || Rantiga || M. Kusiak, M. Żołnowski || MAR || align=right | 1.1 km || 
|-id=918 bgcolor=#fefefe
| 445918 ||  || — || December 6, 2012 || Kitt Peak || Spacewatch || — || align=right data-sort-value="0.85" | 850 m || 
|-id=919 bgcolor=#fefefe
| 445919 ||  || — || January 27, 2007 || Mount Lemmon || Mount Lemmon Survey || — || align=right data-sort-value="0.61" | 610 m || 
|-id=920 bgcolor=#fefefe
| 445920 ||  || — || October 1, 2008 || Kitt Peak || Spacewatch || V || align=right data-sort-value="0.80" | 800 m || 
|-id=921 bgcolor=#E9E9E9
| 445921 ||  || — || May 25, 2006 || Kitt Peak || Spacewatch || — || align=right data-sort-value="0.80" | 800 m || 
|-id=922 bgcolor=#fefefe
| 445922 ||  || — || October 15, 2004 || Kitt Peak || Spacewatch || — || align=right data-sort-value="0.97" | 970 m || 
|-id=923 bgcolor=#fefefe
| 445923 ||  || — || January 29, 2003 || Kitt Peak || Spacewatch || (2076) || align=right data-sort-value="0.86" | 860 m || 
|-id=924 bgcolor=#E9E9E9
| 445924 ||  || — || October 9, 2007 || Anderson Mesa || LONEOS || EUN || align=right | 1.3 km || 
|-id=925 bgcolor=#E9E9E9
| 445925 ||  || — || January 3, 2000 || Kitt Peak || Spacewatch || — || align=right | 1.8 km || 
|-id=926 bgcolor=#fefefe
| 445926 ||  || — || December 18, 2001 || Socorro || LINEAR || — || align=right data-sort-value="0.93" | 930 m || 
|-id=927 bgcolor=#fefefe
| 445927 ||  || — || October 2, 2008 || Kitt Peak || Spacewatch || — || align=right data-sort-value="0.67" | 670 m || 
|-id=928 bgcolor=#E9E9E9
| 445928 ||  || — || December 5, 2012 || Mount Lemmon || Mount Lemmon Survey || — || align=right | 1.0 km || 
|-id=929 bgcolor=#fefefe
| 445929 ||  || — || October 23, 2004 || Kitt Peak || Spacewatch || MAS || align=right data-sort-value="0.70" | 700 m || 
|-id=930 bgcolor=#E9E9E9
| 445930 ||  || — || March 9, 2005 || Kitt Peak || Spacewatch || — || align=right | 1.2 km || 
|-id=931 bgcolor=#fefefe
| 445931 ||  || — || December 20, 2009 || Mount Lemmon || Mount Lemmon Survey || — || align=right data-sort-value="0.65" | 650 m || 
|-id=932 bgcolor=#fefefe
| 445932 ||  || — || October 2, 2008 || Mount Lemmon || Mount Lemmon Survey || — || align=right data-sort-value="0.61" | 610 m || 
|-id=933 bgcolor=#E9E9E9
| 445933 ||  || — || October 16, 2003 || Kitt Peak || Spacewatch || — || align=right | 1.7 km || 
|-id=934 bgcolor=#fefefe
| 445934 ||  || — || September 9, 2008 || Mount Lemmon || Mount Lemmon Survey || — || align=right data-sort-value="0.78" | 780 m || 
|-id=935 bgcolor=#E9E9E9
| 445935 ||  || — || December 19, 2004 || Anderson Mesa || LONEOS || EUN || align=right | 1.4 km || 
|-id=936 bgcolor=#fefefe
| 445936 ||  || — || November 3, 2008 || Mount Lemmon || Mount Lemmon Survey || — || align=right | 1.0 km || 
|-id=937 bgcolor=#fefefe
| 445937 ||  || — || September 4, 2008 || Kitt Peak || Spacewatch || — || align=right data-sort-value="0.65" | 650 m || 
|-id=938 bgcolor=#E9E9E9
| 445938 ||  || — || January 5, 2013 || Kitt Peak || Spacewatch || — || align=right | 2.0 km || 
|-id=939 bgcolor=#fefefe
| 445939 ||  || — || March 2, 1995 || Kitt Peak || Spacewatch || — || align=right | 1.1 km || 
|-id=940 bgcolor=#E9E9E9
| 445940 ||  || — || January 3, 2013 || Catalina || CSS || — || align=right | 1.7 km || 
|-id=941 bgcolor=#fefefe
| 445941 ||  || — || May 29, 2011 || Mount Lemmon || Mount Lemmon Survey || — || align=right | 1.4 km || 
|-id=942 bgcolor=#E9E9E9
| 445942 ||  || — || November 24, 2008 || Mount Lemmon || Mount Lemmon Survey || — || align=right data-sort-value="0.89" | 890 m || 
|-id=943 bgcolor=#E9E9E9
| 445943 ||  || — || February 2, 2005 || Kitt Peak || Spacewatch || — || align=right | 1.1 km || 
|-id=944 bgcolor=#fefefe
| 445944 ||  || — || September 10, 2004 || Kitt Peak || Spacewatch || — || align=right data-sort-value="0.75" | 750 m || 
|-id=945 bgcolor=#fefefe
| 445945 ||  || — || November 24, 1997 || Kitt Peak || Spacewatch || — || align=right data-sort-value="0.65" | 650 m || 
|-id=946 bgcolor=#fefefe
| 445946 ||  || — || October 22, 2008 || Kitt Peak || Spacewatch || V || align=right data-sort-value="0.74" | 740 m || 
|-id=947 bgcolor=#fefefe
| 445947 ||  || — || January 3, 2013 || Mount Lemmon || Mount Lemmon Survey || V || align=right data-sort-value="0.62" | 620 m || 
|-id=948 bgcolor=#E9E9E9
| 445948 ||  || — || April 2, 2005 || Kitt Peak || Spacewatch || — || align=right | 1.4 km || 
|-id=949 bgcolor=#E9E9E9
| 445949 ||  || — || January 19, 2004 || Kitt Peak || Spacewatch || — || align=right | 2.1 km || 
|-id=950 bgcolor=#fefefe
| 445950 ||  || — || March 23, 2006 || Catalina || CSS || — || align=right | 1.0 km || 
|-id=951 bgcolor=#fefefe
| 445951 ||  || — || November 3, 2008 || Mount Lemmon || Mount Lemmon Survey || — || align=right data-sort-value="0.82" | 820 m || 
|-id=952 bgcolor=#fefefe
| 445952 ||  || — || October 31, 2008 || Catalina || CSS || — || align=right data-sort-value="0.92" | 920 m || 
|-id=953 bgcolor=#fefefe
| 445953 ||  || — || February 12, 2002 || Kitt Peak || Spacewatch || NYS || align=right data-sort-value="0.64" | 640 m || 
|-id=954 bgcolor=#fefefe
| 445954 ||  || — || December 24, 2005 || Kitt Peak || Spacewatch || V || align=right data-sort-value="0.55" | 550 m || 
|-id=955 bgcolor=#fefefe
| 445955 ||  || — || November 10, 2004 || Kitt Peak || Spacewatch || NYS || align=right data-sort-value="0.80" | 800 m || 
|-id=956 bgcolor=#fefefe
| 445956 ||  || — || November 1, 2008 || Mount Lemmon || Mount Lemmon Survey || — || align=right | 1.1 km || 
|-id=957 bgcolor=#fefefe
| 445957 ||  || — || September 30, 2005 || Catalina || CSS || — || align=right data-sort-value="0.94" | 940 m || 
|-id=958 bgcolor=#fefefe
| 445958 ||  || — || January 15, 2013 || Catalina || CSS || — || align=right data-sort-value="0.87" | 870 m || 
|-id=959 bgcolor=#fefefe
| 445959 ||  || — || December 29, 2008 || Kitt Peak || Spacewatch || — || align=right data-sort-value="0.74" | 740 m || 
|-id=960 bgcolor=#fefefe
| 445960 ||  || — || September 8, 2011 || Kitt Peak || Spacewatch || V || align=right data-sort-value="0.80" | 800 m || 
|-id=961 bgcolor=#E9E9E9
| 445961 ||  || — || January 5, 2013 || Kitt Peak || Spacewatch || — || align=right | 3.2 km || 
|-id=962 bgcolor=#E9E9E9
| 445962 ||  || — || December 28, 2003 || Socorro || LINEAR || — || align=right | 1.9 km || 
|-id=963 bgcolor=#fefefe
| 445963 ||  || — || November 17, 2004 || Campo Imperatore || CINEOS || — || align=right data-sort-value="0.86" | 860 m || 
|-id=964 bgcolor=#fefefe
| 445964 ||  || — || December 3, 2000 || Kitt Peak || Spacewatch || — || align=right data-sort-value="0.93" | 930 m || 
|-id=965 bgcolor=#E9E9E9
| 445965 ||  || — || January 3, 2009 || Mount Lemmon || Mount Lemmon Survey || — || align=right | 1.8 km || 
|-id=966 bgcolor=#E9E9E9
| 445966 ||  || — || March 11, 2005 || Mount Lemmon || Mount Lemmon Survey || — || align=right | 1.4 km || 
|-id=967 bgcolor=#fefefe
| 445967 ||  || — || September 23, 2008 || Kitt Peak || Spacewatch || — || align=right data-sort-value="0.80" | 800 m || 
|-id=968 bgcolor=#E9E9E9
| 445968 ||  || — || October 13, 2007 || Catalina || CSS || (5) || align=right data-sort-value="0.94" | 940 m || 
|-id=969 bgcolor=#fefefe
| 445969 ||  || — || January 28, 2006 || Kitt Peak || Spacewatch || — || align=right data-sort-value="0.75" | 750 m || 
|-id=970 bgcolor=#fefefe
| 445970 ||  || — || December 21, 2008 || Catalina || CSS || NYS || align=right data-sort-value="0.70" | 700 m || 
|-id=971 bgcolor=#E9E9E9
| 445971 ||  || — || January 16, 2005 || Kitt Peak || Spacewatch || — || align=right | 1.2 km || 
|-id=972 bgcolor=#fefefe
| 445972 ||  || — || June 27, 2010 || WISE || WISE || — || align=right | 2.7 km || 
|-id=973 bgcolor=#d6d6d6
| 445973 ||  || — || January 17, 2013 || Mount Lemmon || Mount Lemmon Survey || EOS || align=right | 1.5 km || 
|-id=974 bgcolor=#FFC2E0
| 445974 ||  || — || January 16, 2013 || Haleakala || Pan-STARRS || APOPHAcritical || align=right data-sort-value="0.32" | 320 m || 
|-id=975 bgcolor=#fefefe
| 445975 ||  || — || March 5, 2006 || Kitt Peak || Spacewatch || — || align=right data-sort-value="0.67" | 670 m || 
|-id=976 bgcolor=#E9E9E9
| 445976 ||  || — || April 19, 2010 || WISE || WISE || — || align=right | 2.4 km || 
|-id=977 bgcolor=#fefefe
| 445977 ||  || — || December 1, 2008 || Mount Lemmon || Mount Lemmon Survey || — || align=right data-sort-value="0.94" | 940 m || 
|-id=978 bgcolor=#fefefe
| 445978 ||  || — || December 7, 2005 || Catalina || CSS || — || align=right data-sort-value="0.68" | 680 m || 
|-id=979 bgcolor=#fefefe
| 445979 ||  || — || February 25, 2006 || Kitt Peak || Spacewatch || — || align=right data-sort-value="0.75" | 750 m || 
|-id=980 bgcolor=#fefefe
| 445980 ||  || — || April 9, 2006 || Kitt Peak || Spacewatch || NYS || align=right data-sort-value="0.75" | 750 m || 
|-id=981 bgcolor=#E9E9E9
| 445981 ||  || — || September 13, 2007 || Catalina || CSS || — || align=right | 1.2 km || 
|-id=982 bgcolor=#E9E9E9
| 445982 ||  || — || January 5, 2013 || Kitt Peak || Spacewatch || — || align=right | 2.3 km || 
|-id=983 bgcolor=#fefefe
| 445983 ||  || — || November 3, 2004 || Kitt Peak || Spacewatch || — || align=right data-sort-value="0.85" | 850 m || 
|-id=984 bgcolor=#E9E9E9
| 445984 ||  || — || November 20, 2003 || Kitt Peak || Spacewatch || — || align=right | 1.3 km || 
|-id=985 bgcolor=#E9E9E9
| 445985 ||  || — || March 3, 2005 || Catalina || CSS || — || align=right | 1.2 km || 
|-id=986 bgcolor=#fefefe
| 445986 ||  || — || September 28, 2000 || Kitt Peak || Spacewatch || — || align=right data-sort-value="0.82" | 820 m || 
|-id=987 bgcolor=#fefefe
| 445987 ||  || — || January 7, 2006 || Mount Lemmon || Mount Lemmon Survey || — || align=right data-sort-value="0.64" | 640 m || 
|-id=988 bgcolor=#E9E9E9
| 445988 ||  || — || November 20, 2008 || Mount Lemmon || Mount Lemmon Survey || MAR || align=right data-sort-value="0.94" | 940 m || 
|-id=989 bgcolor=#fefefe
| 445989 ||  || — || December 11, 2004 || Kitt Peak || Spacewatch || — || align=right data-sort-value="0.74" | 740 m || 
|-id=990 bgcolor=#fefefe
| 445990 ||  || — || January 27, 2006 || Mount Lemmon || Mount Lemmon Survey || — || align=right data-sort-value="0.65" | 650 m || 
|-id=991 bgcolor=#d6d6d6
| 445991 ||  || — || September 4, 2010 || Mount Lemmon || Mount Lemmon Survey || EOS || align=right | 1.9 km || 
|-id=992 bgcolor=#fefefe
| 445992 ||  || — || November 20, 2008 || Kitt Peak || Spacewatch || — || align=right | 1.2 km || 
|-id=993 bgcolor=#E9E9E9
| 445993 ||  || — || August 24, 2007 || Kitt Peak || Spacewatch || — || align=right data-sort-value="0.76" | 760 m || 
|-id=994 bgcolor=#d6d6d6
| 445994 ||  || — || April 4, 2008 || Catalina || CSS || LIX || align=right | 3.5 km || 
|-id=995 bgcolor=#E9E9E9
| 445995 ||  || — || March 31, 2005 || Kitt Peak || Spacewatch || — || align=right | 1.9 km || 
|-id=996 bgcolor=#E9E9E9
| 445996 ||  || — || November 13, 2007 || Kitt Peak || Spacewatch || — || align=right | 1.4 km || 
|-id=997 bgcolor=#E9E9E9
| 445997 ||  || — || August 21, 2006 || Kitt Peak || Spacewatch || — || align=right | 2.4 km || 
|-id=998 bgcolor=#fefefe
| 445998 ||  || — || September 28, 2008 || Socorro || LINEAR || — || align=right data-sort-value="0.65" | 650 m || 
|-id=999 bgcolor=#fefefe
| 445999 ||  || — || March 5, 2002 || Kitt Peak || Spacewatch || — || align=right data-sort-value="0.82" | 820 m || 
|-id=000 bgcolor=#fefefe
| 446000 ||  || — || January 4, 2013 || Mount Lemmon || Mount Lemmon Survey || NYS || align=right data-sort-value="0.76" | 760 m || 
|}

References

External links 
 Discovery Circumstances: Numbered Minor Planets (445001)–(450000) (IAU Minor Planet Center)

0445